Seir Kieran is a Gaelic Athletic Association club located in a parish and Electoral Division of the same name (population c.460). Seir Kieran takes its name from Saint Ciarán of Saighir, who founded the parish as a civitas (a monastic city) in the 5th century. The club's playing facilities are based in the village of Clareen in County Offaly, Ireland.

Seir Kieran caters mainly for players of the games of hurling and camogie, although the club has also competed in the Offaly football competitions and reached the Offaly Senior Football Semi-final in 1927. Founded in 1887, for 67 of its 128 years, and continuously since 1970, the club has competed in the Offaly Senior Hurling Championship, winning the Sean Robbins Cup on four occasions. Seir Kieran have also had successes at junior, intermediate and under-age levels, for example winning the Offaly Junior 'A' Hurling Championship for the seventh time in 2014.

Players from Seir Kieran were on each of the four Offaly teams that have won the Liam MacCarthy Cup, and eleven hurling All Star Awards have been won by five players from Seir Kieran: Eugene Coughlan (1984, 1985); Johnny Dooley (1994, 1995, 2000); Kevin Kinahan (1994, 1995, 1998); Billy Dooley (1994, 1995); and Joe Dooley (1998). Three players from the club have captained the Offaly Senior hurling team – Joe Dooley (1997), Johnny Dooley (2000), and Joe Bergin (2014). Two Clareen players have captained Offaly teams that reached All Ireland Junior Hurling Finals – Jimmy Corrigan (1915), and P.J. Grogan (1929). Joe Dooley managed the Offaly Senior hurlers from 2008 to 2011.

Early years

First twenty-five years, 1887 to 1912

The advent of the GAA club at Clareen in 1887 coincided with the drive to build a new Parish Church, as the old one (erected in 1795 in the townland of Breaghmore) had become structurally unsound. The first secretary of the club, from 1887 until he emigrated in 1895, was Frank Pilkington of Bell Hill. Pilkington went on to become secretary to the Offaly GAA Club in New York for many years. Seir Kieran participated in competitions year on year. In 1907, the Offaly hurling championship was divided into Senior and Junior grades, and in 1909, the Offaly County Board introduced the "Parish Rule". These developments led to a first big breakthrough for club, when they beat Roscore (3-0 to 1-1) in the Offaly Junior Final for 1912. This final was not actually played until November 1913. Although a Central Council ruling, earlier in 1913, had reduced team size form 17 players to 15, this did not affect the still-unfinished 1912 championship. As such, Seir Kieran and Roscore may have been the last-ever teams to play a 17-a-side hurling final.

It was during this period that Seir Kieran adopted their present club colours, of black and amber (similar to the Kilkenny county colours). In November 1911, John Drennan of Conway Hall, Kells, County Kilkenny donated a set of black and amber jerseys to the Kilkenny County Board, GAA. It is reported that prior to this gesture, he had won a large amount of money on a horse whose jockey wore those colours. John Drennan was a brother of Fr. Jeremiah Drennan, parish priest of Seir Kieran from 1904 to 1921. It is likely that Fr. Drennan emulated his brother's gesture by presenting the club with a set of jerseys identical to the Kilkenny ones.

Great War to the 1930s
From 1915 to 1918, Jimmy Corrigan of Clareen served as secretary to the Offaly County Board, GAA. Corrigan was captain of the team which won Offaly's first Leinster Junior Hurling Championship and advanced to the 1915 All Ireland Final. On account of the Easter Rising, this Final could not be played out until 20 August 1916, when Offaly traveled on a D.E. Williams motor lorry to Athlone and narrowly lost to Tipperary (1-6 to 2-2). By that stage, Corrigan was doing his club hurling with the Birr Club, as he taught at the Workhouse Schools in the Town. He was also secretary to the Birr Sinn Féin Club, and (clandestinely) a lieutenant of Volunteers. He died aged 27 in October 1918, either from tuberculosis, or from the Spanish 'Flu which reached pandemic proportions that year. Corrigan was deeply mourned by his comrades in the Offaly GAA, who erected a Celtic Cross-shaped commemorative headstone over his grave in the Seir Kieran New Cemetery. 

Seir Kieran reached the 1920 Junior Hurling Final. On account of the War of Independence and the Civil War (when the Clareen Company, 4th Battalion, IRA comprised several Seir Kieran hurlers), this Final could not be played off until 13 May 1923, when Clara defeated them (Clara 5-2, Seir Kieran 2-1). In the Junior Final for 1923 proper, played at Kilcormac on 18 November, Seir Kieran won their second Title with a 4-0 to 1-0 victory over Tullamore. Paddy Corrigan was captain. One of that team, Tom Dooley, represented the club on the Offaly panel that won the 1923 Junior All Ireland. Again owing to the Civil War, the All Ireland Final against Cork could not be fixed until July 1924. Cork initially would not participate in protest at the continuing imprisonment of their County Board chairman Sean McCarthy (who had sided with the Irregular or Republican side), whereupon a walkover was awarded to Offaly. The Offaly County Board unanimously refused to accept the Title on that basis, and the Final eventually went ahead at Croke Park on 12 October 1924. Offaly won a thrilling, uncompromising battle by 3-4 to Cork's 3-2. The captain was Jack Holligan of Kinnitty, while Drumcullen's Bill Fox gave a man-of-the-match display.

In 1929, PJ Grogan of Clareen captained Offaly to a second Junior All Ireland hurling title. Cork again provided the opposition in the Final, played out on 15 December 1929 at Thurles, and were beaten by 2-3 to Offaly's 6-1. On the club scene, Seir Kieran were unlucky to lose the 1927 Offaly Senior Hurling (South County) Final, going down to Drumcullen by 3-3 to 2-4. Discontent with the Land Commission's subdivision of the Kilmaine estate militated against unity of purpose in the club, and Kilmaine House itself was burned down in the early hours of Monday 23 July 1926. Seir Kieran did however contest the Junior Championship of 1929, overcoming Birr and Coolderry before losing to Shannonharbour (5-3 to 2-2) in the Semi-final, on 8 September 1929. In May 1931, young John Coughlan played in goals for the Offaly Minors (against Westmeath at Clara).

Intermediate success
The first Intermediate Title came in Ballyduff, Tullamore on 20 September 1931, when Seir Kieran (captained by PJ Grogan) beat Clara by 5-7 to 2-5. At Senior grade for the following two seasons, the Clareen side gave stirring displays against the likes of Coolderry and a rising Tullamore team. The 1932 panel was augmented by Dick and Willie Conway from Roscomroe, a district of Kinnitty Parish with historic ties to Seir Kieran. Other noted players included Mick Leahy, Kieran Grogan and Dan Murphy, although none could compare with red-maned Jim Killeen "the thatcher", one of the finest-ever Clareen hurlers. Originally from Lusmagh, Jim and his brother Mick had come to Clareen as young boys, where they lived with a childless couple, Din Browne and his wife.

Seir Kieran were a diminished force after Killeen went to Killdangan in North Tipperary in the mid-1930s (a time when many others were emigrating to England), but they recovered to claim the Offaly Intermediate Hurling Final of 1938 against North Portarlington. Played at Tullamore on 27 August 1938, this match also served as the Junior Final of 1937, with the result that Seir Kieran annexed both Titles in the one hour of hurling. The Clareen side, featuring players such as Pakie Troy (who served as club secretary for many years) and the great Jack Purcell, scored 6-8 to North Portarlington's 2-1. 

In 1939 the team reached a new high-water mark, by advancing to the Offaly Senior Hurling Final on 22 October against Coolderry. Coolderry relentlessly built up their winning margin of 6-4 to 2-2, to claim their 14th Title. Nonetheless, Seir Kieran matched their opponents well in a fast-paced, hard-hitting contest. Throughout the 1939 championship, their rain-maker was the brilliant Sean O'Neill at midfield. The eldest son of the Clareen schoolmaster, O'Neill was a student at St Kieran's College in Kilkenny, where he captained the team that won out the Leinster Colleges Hurling Championship of 1939.

In the 1940s, despite an ongoing crisis of numbers, Seir Kieran won the Intermediate Hurling contests of 1943 and 1947. The 1943 championship was curtailed by wartime restrictions, especially rationing of petrol and food supplies. On 12 September 1943, Seir Kieran won the Final against Clara by 7-5 to 5-1. Rationing had hardly eased by the Springtime of 1947, when a brutal Arctic freeze was exacerbated by blizzards that set in on St Patrick's Day. Nonetheless, an entertaining Intermediate Championship ensued. In the Semi-Final against Shinrone at Killyon, a last-gasp Jack Purcell point saw Seir Kieran salvage a draw. Due to a "man of the match" performance by Tom Featherstone, they won the replay by 3-6 to 3-2. Featherstone was carried shoulder-high from the field, and Fr. William Brennan the club chairman declared: "This is our Jim Langton".

Seir Kieran won the Intermediate Final against Carrig & Riverstown by 5-3 to 2-4. The medals were awarded in the Parish Hall on St Stephen's Night 1947. The schoolmaster, Mr. Sean O'Neill, the team trainer, Fr. William Brennan PP, and John Coughlan the team captain gave the speeches, in which they looked forward to Senior success in 1948. Good wishes were also extended to Fr. Michael Troy, a member of the panel about to set sail for Africa. Although the team made little headway the following year, the club took great heart from Seamus Mulrooney's brilliant displays with Offaly in the 1948 Leinster Minor Hurling Championship. The Leinster Final was held at Tullamore on 11 July, where Offaly let slip a 0-6 to nil half time lead, and lost to Kilkenny by 5-2 to 3-6.

Junior success 1950 to 1969
During the 1950s emigration reached a staggering rate. A tragedy on the playing field in June 1952, when young John Dooley of Clashroe, Roscomroe was fatally injured by an accidental blow to the head when playing for Seir Kieran, further shook the club's confidence in the future. The mentors managed to rally the team, who beat both Tullamore and Birr to reach the Senior Hurling Final for the first time since 1939. At St Brendan's Park on 31 August 1952, they were beaten by Drumcullen by 9-11 to 4-3.

Despite this outcome, Seir Kieran sustained their Senior challenge both in 1953 (when Coolderry had to be at their best to overcome them) and in 1954 when they reached the Semi-final (before again going down to Coolderry). By 1955, though, the club could not muster 15 Senior players, and so had to concede a walkover to Shannon Rovers in the Championship. The following year at Intermediate grade, the club joined forces with neighboring parish Kinnitty whose demographic situation was just as dire. The amalgamated team, known as St Flannan's, won through to the 1956 Intermediate Hurling Final against Ferbane on 16 September 1956. St Flannan's (wearing green and white) emerged victorious by 4-7 to 4-1. Promoted to Senior grade in 1957, St Flannan's were heavily defeated in their opening match to Shannon Rovers – a result which put an end to the Kinnitty-Clareen combination. Consequently, it was again under the Seir Kieran banner that the Clareen men fielded in 1958, and won passage to the 1958 Junior Hurling Final. Delayed until 8 March 1959, this Final saw Seir Kieran defeating St Columba's (Durrow) by 4-6 to 1-1. 1958 was the Parish's fourth Title at Junior grade, and was crucial in boosting morale after the big setbacks during the decade gone by. A reporter for the Midland Tribune described the challenge that this posed to the club's viability, especially once they stepped up to Senior grade in 1960 and 1961:
 "Coolderry had a few newcomers but Seir Kieran were less lucky. Limited to the smallest parish in Ireland, they had to rely on several veterans who still keep the colours flying, and here lay their weakness – the lack of vigorous youth. That they still maintain a Senior team is a tribute to the players and club officials; that they take to the field year after year with high hopes is a tribute to all concerned."

Another morale boost came in October 1961, with the acquisition of six statute acres adjacent to Clareen crossroads, as a permanent home for the club. This purchase was signed off on by four trustees: John Coughlan and Seamus Mulrooney, on behalf of Seir Kieran; and Rody O'Brien and John Dowling, on behalf of the Offaly County Board. Development of these facilities was coupled with more organized training of the talented younger players who began to emerge. Seir Kieran had an inspirational one-point win over the new St. Rynagh's GAA Club (Banagher and Cloghan combined) in the Junior Hurling Semi-final of 1962, but in the Final on 21 October they slumped to a big defeat (3-10 to 1-1) against Edenderry in Tullamore. It was much the same story in St Brendan's Park on 7 April 1968, when Killeigh beat Seir Kieran by 5-5 to 0-7 in the delayed 1967 Junior Hurling decider.

Notwithstanding such bitter disappointments, the Clareen side were consistently featuring in top-notch, close, exciting Junior matches. In the 1965 Offaly JHC, Kinnitty needed three attempts before edging out Seir Kieran by 2-10 to 3-6. In 1968, a last-minute Joe McKenna goal separated Shinrone and Seir Kieran after a thrilling replay. Success finally crowned these endeavours in 1969, when Seir Kieran became Offaly Junior Hurling champions for a fifth time. Once again, the Junior Final was deferred until the following Spring. On 26 April 1970, the team traveled to Tullamore and defeated Clara by the minimum (3-2 to 1-7). Tim Mulrooney the captain lifted the James Clarke Cup. Seir Kieran have fielded a Senior team in each subsequent year.

At senior grade 1970 to 1979

Return to the top flight, 1970 to 1974
On 7 June 1970 (in their first Senior hurling game since July 1961), the Clareen team very nearly toppled reigning champions St Rynagh's. Damien Martin's goalkeeping enabled St Rynagh's to battle back for a draw (Seir Kieran 4-6, St Rynagh's 2-12). Fore-warned was fore-armed in the replay on 12 July, when the Banagher men won by 4-13 to 2-3. The Clareen side were still alive in the 1970 championship, but were eliminated by Coolderry in the next round. There was only one bite of the cherry in 1971, when Seir Kieran were dismissed by Ballyskenagh. While they won their opening round match against Rahan in 1972, Kinnitty proved too strong for the black and amber when the next round was finally played off in October.

In both 1973 and 1974, something of a back door system operated in the Offaly Senior Hurling Championship. Therefore, Seir Kieran's 2-12 to 1-8 loss to Birr in June 1973 set them on the road to the Loser's Group Final against Na Piarsaigh (Killoughey and Kilcormac combined). It took a trilogy of matches to decide this Final. The first two installments, played at Birr on successive Sundays in September, ended in deadlock. It was a different story in the second replay, for which the venue was switched to Tullamore. Seir Kieran did not play well, and Na Piarsaigh ran out winners by 1-13 to 1-4.

The Offaly GAA Convention for 1974 passed a motion that the Fixtures Committee be mindful of the ongoing Oil Crisis when selecting venues. Measurements on the playing field were also changing – 70 yard frees were replaced by 65 metre frees. New rules decreed the painting of large and small rectangles. A player could not be in the square before the ball, only three defenders could line the goals in the event of a penalty, and charging a player not in possession was banned. Like many other hurling panels, Seir Kieran would have considerable trouble adapting to the new rules. They opened their 1974 Senior campaign with a narrow loss to Kinnitty. A bigger defeat followed at the hands of Drumcullen in the next round, but Seir Kieran had another chance in the Senior Hurling 'B' Championship.

Seir Kieran defeated St Carthage's (Rahan) to advance to the 'B' Final, played in Birr on 24 November 1974. In a mean-spirited game, Lusmagh took an early lead which they still held when the game was abandoned in the second half. At a County Board Disciplinary Committee hearing on the Wednesday before Christmas, both clubs were fined £20; while two Seir Kieran players and one Lusmagh player were suspended for six months. In spite of the eventual outcome, Seir Kieran took heart from the clear progress that was being made, including in terms of representation on the Offaly hurling panels. Kieran Mooney had been Offaly's top scorer (0-8) in their narrow loss to Dublin in the Leinster U-21 Hurling Final of 1972. Kieran Mooney along with Sean Bergin also represented the club in 1974, when an Offaly side managed by Brother Denis Minehan and captained by a young Pádraig Horan recorded a first-ever win over Dublin in the Leinster Senior Hurling Championship. The Semi-final against Kilkenny took place at Croke Park, where Mooney put Offaly's opening goal past Noel Skehan. (Despite Damien Martin's heroics in the Offaly goals, however, Kilkenny advanced without undue trouble.)

Schools hurling and underage hurling
 Even more encouraging for the Club's future was the organized effort being made at primary school level, led in Clareen's case by successive Principals of Seir Kieran National School: Mr. Frank McNamara; Mr. Tony Hogan; Mr. Damien White; Mrs. Majella Gibbons; and Mr. Jonathan Dunne in the present day. In 1974, a team captained by Joe Dooley won Seir Kieran's first Bord na Scol hurling championship. This feat was emulated in 1976, when Mick Mulrooney captained the Bord na Scol team. Seir Kieran went on to claim the Offaly U-14 'B' hurling title for 1976 – an achievement indeed for a club that had waited 40 years to win an under-age championship. The school teams were mentored by Damien White N.T., Canon Seán Collier, and Tony Murphy; while the U-14s were looked after by Club chairman Paddy Guinan, Canon Collier, Seamus Mulrooney and John Joe Coffey. There was also a big input from the parents and many others in the parish community.

Although ultimately unsuccessful, Seir Kieran had also won through to both the Minor 'B' and the U-21 Hurling Finals of 1974. Of the Minor 'B' Final against much-fancied Killeigh, the Midland Tribune reported that "At no stage was full back Eugene Coughlan allowed to relax his most extraordinary talents". Future stalwarts such as Paddy Mulrooney, Noel Bergin, Jimmy Connor, Mick Coughlan, Johnny Abbott and Joe Mooney also featured. Johnny Abbott played in goals that year for the U-21 team, coached by Tony Murphy. He was kept busy in the U-21 Final against Kinnitty, where much of the Minor panel, augmented by players like Liam Corcoran, Brendan Coughlan, Val Kennedy, Sean Coughlan, Barney Breslin and Joe Bergin, proved no match for a Kinnitty side powered by Pat Delaney, Des Egan and Frank Bergin. Despite this setback, it was clear that Seir Kieran's unfolding horizons were very bright. At the club's AGM for 1975, an intense discussion took place on how to bring on all of the young players. This resulted in something of a "new departure" for Seir Kieran – the establishment of a Minor Club with Seamus Mulrooney as its first chairman.

From the 1960s onward, the Vocational Schools and the other post-primary schools in Offaly had put emphasis on the proper preparation of their GAA teams. This process would receive an important boost with the opening of St. Brendan's Community School in Birr in 1980. The catchment area of the Community School comprises much of Offaly's hurling heartland, as well as contiguous parts of north Tipperary. The experience of winning together for the School tended to dilute the old parochial bitternesses, and to ensure that these students would give of their best for their County later on.

Consolidation of senior status
The great strides being made at other grades gradually percolated into Seir Kieran's Senior displays also. Although they beat Lusmagh in the 1975 championship, Drumcullen exploited a lack of pace to put an end to the Clareen interest that year. Seir Kieran came within an ace of turning the tables in 1976. A highlight of their first round victory over St Carthage's was Sean Coughlan's tussle with the Rahan centre forward, Pat Corcoran. The second round clash at first seemed like deja vu as Drumcullen amassed a 12-point lead, despite scores from Billy Kennedy and Patsy Coffey and Mick Murphy's chipping in a goal from the corner of the square. A comeback after the interval was stopped just short. In the end, Seir Kieran paid the price for some erratic shooting – but they had again put the County on notice that they were a team to watch.

This point was driven home in 1977 when, following a narrow first round defeat to Tullamore, Seir Kieran went into the Losers' Group and faced St Rynagh's on a chilly June day at Kilcormac. Throwing down the gauntlet with sturdy ground hurling, the Clareen 15 launched into the attack, and eliminated the five-in-a-row County Champions by 4-9 to 1-11. Seir Kieran next beat Na Piarsaigh to reach the 1977 Losers' Group Final; only to slump to defeat (3-8 to 0-11) to Killeigh at Tullamore.

Seir Kieran opened their 1978 campaign with a win against Shinrone. In the second round they met St Rynagh's. Although they beat Killeigh in the third round (4-11 to 1-3), this only led to a tame exit to Coolderry (1-10 to 0-8, of which 0-7 was scored by Kieran Mooney).

Late 1970s
In 1979, St Rynagh's bested Seir Kieran by 1-17 to 1-3 in the opening round, at Kilcormac on 5 August 1979. A St Rynagh's official expressed relief at the result saying: "When we get over that hurdle, other teams don't present quite the same problem."

Seir Kieran beat Killeigh by 2-6 to 1-4 in the next round, despite each side going down to 14 men after hurleys and fists flew. It was a much more disciplined and cohesive Clareen team that fielded in St Brendan's Park for their last competitive game of the 1970s, on 26 August 1979. Seir Kieran beat Drumcullen by 3-11 to 0-9.

Seir Kieran and the rise of Offaly, 1975 to 1979

Struggle for consistency
Offaly hurling's trajectory in the later 1970s, like that of Seir Kieran, seemed to be a case of two steps forward, one step back. By 1975, future All Stars Pat Fleury (Drumcullen) and Joachim Kelly (Lusmagh) were regulars on the Senior team, while Kieran Mooney represented Seir Kieran. A somewhat laboured 1-14 to 0-11 win over Kildare set up a Leinster Senior Hurling Semi-final clash with Wexford. By the interval Offaly were being beaten stupid, despite Kieran Mooney getting the game's only goal from play; but in a scintillating third-quarter display, Offaly raised nine white flags in 17 minutes. However Wexford maintained their long-range sniping (all six Wexford forwards and their two midfielders scored at least twice) and prevailed by 1-29 to 1-18. The Offaly Minors, including several Seir Kieran players, were making slow but significant progress as well, and ran Wexford close in the Leinster Minor Hurling Semi-final of 1976 (2-15 to 4-8).

During the National Hurling League of 1976/77, Offaly began to demonstrate the strength and depth of their hurling revival. Defeating Wicklow and Laois and drawing with Waterford in close, tough pre-Christmas matches, they began the New Year by beating Westmeath then taking Galway by 2-6 to 1-5 in a major upset. Their no-nonsense brand of ground hurling similarly overcame Antrim at Corrigan Park, Belfast to win out Division 1B and advance to the Quarter-finals. Against Wexford at Nowlan Park, the rank outsiders overturned the reigning Leinster champions by 1-12 to 1-8. Pádraig Horan (St Rynagh's) dominated at centre back, while Pat Delaney (Kinnitty) was unerring from placed balls. In the League Semi-final against Clare, at Thurles on 10 April 1977, a 2-15 to 0-7 defeat brought Offaly crashing back to earth; and another costly lesson was learned in the subsequent Leinster Senior Hurling Championship. On a Mullingar pitch made slippery by non-stop rain, Offaly were miles off the pace as Dublin eliminated them by 3-10 to 2-8. Some measure of revenge was exacted by the winning of Offaly's first Walsh Cup against Dublin (7-7 to 1-7), the following 4 December at Birr. Eugene Coughlan's brace of goals were a highlight of an Offaly performance (for those who were there to see) of revelatory force.

Breakthrough at U-21 level
Success finally came in 1978, when the Offaly Under-21 hurlers annexed the Leinster Title that had narrowly eluded them in 1972. Noel Bergin at corner forward and Joe Mooney at wing back represented Seir Kieran. Wins over Carlow (4-17 to 1-6) and Wexford (5-9 to 1-10) set up a Leinster Final clash with Laois, at Carlow in July 1978, and a 2-14 to 2-7 victory. Jim Troy (Lusmagh) was goalkeeper, and Brendan Keeshan (Shinrone) was captain. Offaly progressed to their first-ever All Ireland U-21 Semi-final – and a bitter 2-14 to 2-7 defeat at the hands of a Galway squad whose hurling bore a more authoritative stamp. Despite this sequel, to have made a breakthrough at the consistently excellent U-21 grade could only be a tonic for Offaly hurling. The Senior team could not emulate the U-21s in 1978, submitting meekly to Kilkenny (2-17 to 1-4); but they would pull out all the stops the following year.

Administration and Coaching
Fr. Sean Heaney was chairman of the Offaly County Board at this stage, while John Dowling continued his long service as secretary. Two new assistant secretary posts (with responsibility for hurling and for football) were created. In 1978, Seir Kieran's Tony Murphy was elected to the hurling secretary role, in which capacity he would make a singular contribution to the County's success. Persistent and bold experimentation was now a watchword for Offaly management and mentors, as they sought to break the Wexford-Kilkenny stranglehold on the Bob O'Keeffe Cup. One such expedient was to try Pádraig Horan at No. 14; while the erstwhile full forward Eugene Coughlan was switched to defensive duties from 1978 onwards. In the National Hurling League of 1978/79, Offaly showed themselves to be on a par with anything else in Leinster. Drawing with Clare in the opening round – an important result for Offaly following their dismal Leinster Championship exit – they next faced Wexford in Gorey and recorded a victory that still stands apart. With a Seir Kieran contingent of Eugene Coughlan at corner back, Joe Mooney at wing back and Kieran Mooney at corner forward, Offaly battled back from an 11-point half time deficit to prevail by 2-17 to 0-17. Although less spectacular, of even more significance was the third round victory over Kilkenny (3-10 to 2-6), at Birr on 29 October 1978. Although repeatedly foiled by Damien Martin's goalkeeping, Kilkenny did gain sway for 15 minutes of the second half. But Offaly, with Eugene Coughlan now at centre back, reasserted themselves towards the end of a hard-fought, fair, no-holds-barred encounter and a notable victory.

Éamonn Cregan's personal tally of 2-7 for Limerick in the fourth round, at Ennis on 12 November 1978, in itself would have been enough to dispose of Offaly. However, another stirring Offaly performance resulted in a draw against Galway in bitterly cold late November conditions. Eugene Coughlan kept Noel Lane out of contention. The teams were level seven times, with Kieran Mooney's point tying it up with just seconds to go. Defeat to Waterford at Dungarvan in February 1979 did not derail Offaly's advance to the League Semi-Final against Tipperary. Although concession of too many frees again cost Offaly dear, this was an exciting and competitive encounter, with Paddy Kirwan (Ballyskenagh) converting a last-minute free despite the huge tension, to leave it all square (Offaly 4-8, Tipperary 1-17).

This form was not maintained in the League Semi-final replay at Croke Park on 15 April, which Tipperary easily won. This was not the best prelude to encountering Wexford in the Leinster Senior Hurling Semi-final, fixed for Athy on 24 June 1979. Nonetheless, the casual beginning to this match gave way to a thrilling climax, when gallant Offaly went down by the minimum. Offaly began with an all-Seir Kieran half back line of Joe Mooney, Eugene Coughlan and Kieran Mooney, with Coughlan in particular doing many fine things at centre back. Lusmagh's Joachim Kelly played a powerful game at midfield, while of the forwards, Pat Carroll (Coolderry) posed the greatest threat. Offaly had their noses in front in the closing stages, but conceded the frees that allowed Buggy to level for Wexford; then Casey pointed from Tony Doran's '65, and Wexford advanced by 0-17 to 2-10.

Although this slender defeat was a big setback, the National Hurling League of 1979/80 again indicated that Offaly were not far off. One man playing close attention was Monsignor Tommy Maher of Thomastown, who had revolutionised the coaching of hurling from his base at St Kieran's College. The Monsignor was instrumental in persuading Dermot Healy, of the Conaghy Shamrocks Club, to take up the position of Offaly coach in November 1979. On 18 November in Nowlan Park, Offaly had a signal victory (2-9 to 3-4) over Kilkenny, proving that their October 1978 win had been no flash in the pan. Eugene Coughlan was in great form at midfield; Pádraig Horan scored both of Offaly's goals; and newcomer Mark Corrigan (Kinnitty) continued to impress. By this stage Offaly (along with Galway) had become the longest-surviving team in League Division 1. But the Leinster Championship remained the real test.

Lifting the Bob O'Keeffe Cup, 1980 and the Liam MacCarthy Cup, 1981

Victory in Leinster, 1980
The Leinster Senior Hurling championship of 1980 was the first to take place under the "Open Draw" system, meaning that Kilkenny and Wexford would no longer be kept on different sides of the draw. Offaly were trained by Andy Gallagher (Tullamore) as well as Dermot Healy, and the other selectors were Tommy Erritty (Coolderry), Charlie Daly (Na Piarsaigh), Mick Spain (Drumcullen) and Paudge Mulhare (St Rynagh's). Offaly's campaign began at Portlaoise with a 2-10 to 0-12  victory over Laois. Damien Martin's hand injury led to his replacement by Seir Kieran's Noel Bergin, and the other two Clareen players were Eugene Coughlan and Joe Mooney. The Semi-final took place on 8 June 1980, when Offaly beat Dublin (despite an eye injury to Mark Corrigan) by 0-18 to 0-10. The Faithful County were through to their first Leinster Senior Hurling final since 1969, with Damien Martin and Kinnitty's Johnny Flaherty the only players to bridge the gap. The opposition was again Kilkenny, and they also fielded two survivors from the 1969 encounter – Noel Skehan and Liam "Chunky" O'Brien.

Before a poor attendance of 9,631, Offaly's seismic 3-17 to 5-10 victory was as glorious for the manner in which it was achieved as for the way it overturned the Faithful County's seven previous defeats at this stage. Offaly won because, apart from the character that allowed them to shrug off the five Kilkenny goals, they had the fitness to harry the aristocrats mercilessly for the entire seventy minutes, and the skill and economy to convert most of their own scoring chances. Kilkenny full forward Matthew Ruth's quicksilver display continued to trouble the Offaly defence even after the introduction of substitute Eugene Coughlan. Nonetheless, it was the rattled Kilkenny mentors who rang in the changes at the start of the second half. Offaly had gone three points down when they were awarded a penalty, which Pádraig Horan blasted shoulder-high. Although Sekhan parried, the talismanic Brendan Bermingham (Lusmagh) pounced to level the match. A minute later Horan sent to Johnny Flaherty, who hand-passed to the net. Ruth got a goal back as Kilkenny almost pulled off a Houdini act; but Ger Henderson's 80-yard free drifted wide and the underdogs clung on. In his Evening Press column the following day, Con Houlihan depicted the post-match scene: 
 "But then Noel O'Donoghue made a gesture that signified that he had put in the full stop... The joy on the terraces was all-embracing. Every Offaly citizen in the stands seemed to have been catapulted onto the pitch, and we saw men entitled to free travel go bounding across the turf like young greyhounds let loose in the morning."

Andy Gallagher's assessment summed it up: "They had faith in themselves and in Offaly hurling. Those who opposed the open draw in Leinster got their answer today." It was a day of contrasting emotions for team captain Pádraig Horan – not long after he had lifted the massive Bob O'Keeffe Cup, he received word that his father Tommy had died suddenly. The entire Kilkenny hurling team were present at Ballivor, Banagher for the removal to St Rynagh's Church the following evening. Aside from this sad event, Offaly's celebrations were unconfined – especially when their Senior footballers overcame Dublin to make it an Offaly Double in Leinster. The hurlers advanced to their first Senior All Ireland Semi-final on 3 August 1980, where a more experienced Galway side narrowly won out (4-9 to 3-10). Eugene Coughlan at corner back was effecting many huge clearances, until he was sent to midfield early in the second half. As the constant drizzle turned into a deluge, Galway went six points up. Although Sylvie Linnane was dismissed, the Tribesmen deftly re-organised and extended their lead to eight points. It took Offaly a while to figure out how to deploy the numerical advantage. Eventually Joe Mooney was brought on as the "available" attacker, and Brendan Bermingham's goal plus a late 1-1 from Mark Corrigan left it nick-or-nothing at the finish. Only for a short time did defeat put a dampener on Offaly's epochal breakthrough – which was given added lustre when Pat Carroll and Joachim Kelly received the Faithful County's first All Star Awards in hurling since Damien Martin in 1971.

The 1981 campaign
Over the winter of 1980/81, another teak-tough National Hurling League campaign brought the team further on. At Nowlan Park on 19 April 1981, 14-man Offaly held out for a 2-13 to 4-6 League Semi-final win against Laois, after another cliffhanger of hard close pulling. Pat Delaney lofted in a free that Paddy Kirwan sent to the net for what proved the decisive score, despite a furious Laois onslaught in the dying minutes. Some 19,000 spectators came to Thurles on 3 May for the League Final itself. Offaly won the toss and opted to play against the wind and hail – only to be rocked by Cork's opening salvo of two goals and three points. Offaly effected a tremendous fightback, holding the Rebels scoreless for the last 14 minutes, but they had left themselves with too steep a climb. Cork took the League Title by 3-11 to 2-8.

That year's Leinster Senior Hurling Semi-final (21 June 1981), would be the only championship match of the 1980s or 1990s where Offaly took to the field minus a Seir Kieran contingent. Laois again almost upset the apple cart, as Dermot Healy's charges somehow evaded the usual consequences of piling 20 wides on top of the concession of six goals and ten points. Two penalties and two long-range shots deceived goalie Christy King, while Laois full forward PJ Cuddy had done serious damage by the time Pat Delaney was switched to take him on. Offaly's own tally of 3-20 included a first-half Pádraig Horan goal that had only got in through a big tear in the side netting. Even so, the game was still deadlocked when Offaly were awarded a free over 100 yards out. With the last puck of the game, Paddy Kirwan heroically converted it, for Offaly to reach the Provincial decider by the very skin of their teeth.

On the other side of the draw, Wexford had also advanced, to the first Leinster Final without the Cats since 1961. Eugene Coughlan was handed the number 3 jersey for Offaly – seven years would go by before any other player would wear it in the Senior Hurling Championship – while Damien Martin resumed as first-choice goalkeeper. One of the key duels was Coughlan versus the Wexford full forward, Tony Doran. Early on in the match, amidst a thicket of hurleys that swung on an incoming Wexford ball, Doran went down with a badly gashed forehead and had to be substituted. However, this remained a hum-dinger throughout, as twice Offaly were getting on top and twice Wexford hauled it back. Despite Colm Doran finding the net, from a long-range free two minutes from time, it was Offaly's calmness and self-belief that won out. Damien Martin pucked to Pádraig Horan in midfield, who sent sweetly to Johnny Flaherty and over the bar, to make it 3-12 to 2-13 at the long whistle.

The Leinster Champions won direct passage to the All Ireland Final, played on 6 September 1981. The opposition were defending champions Galway, who had overcome Munster champions Limerick in the Semi-final (following a replay). The official attendance of 71,384 (the highest in 18 years) saw Offaly win their first Senior Hurling Title. Galway made the play for long spells, and the Offaly defence absorbed huge pressure. Eugene Coughlan at full back kept John Connolly scoreless, and it was the same for Joe Connolly when he was switched to full forward. Pat Fleury likewise neutralised Bernie Forde, to round out a flawless campaign in which none of Fleury's direct opponents scored at all.

At the other end, Pat Carroll's knee-high shot beat Galway goalkeeper Michael Conneely to keep Offaly in touch, notwithstanding Galway's first-half dominance. However, this was a team performance with each line of Offaly's formation sticking to the game plan. They were as disciplined as they were tenacious – whereas Joe Connolly converted six times from placed balls in the first half, Offaly conceded just one free after the break. Galway still retained a sizable lead when midfielder Liam Currams (sporting a light beard in what was then a clean-shaven world) soloed forward to score a sweet point. Michael O'Hehir the RTE commentator likened the sliotar on Currams's hurley to "a fried egg on a frying pan". Centre-back Pat Delaney landed an inspirational point from a huge distance. From the puck-out, Galway quickly sent to Noel Lane in the danger area, who whipped in a ferocious shot. Damien Martin was at full stretch in less than a heartbeat, to somehow turn its trajectory around the upright. Offaly made the most of their reprieve, Johnny Flaherty reducing the margin to two with a well-worked point. Pat Delaney reached skyward to intercept Iggy Clarke's long clearance, laying off to Brendan Bermingham at half forward who hand-passed to Johnny Flaherty, momentarily in the clear. Although the defence converged rapidly, Flaherty palmed over his left shoulder to the net. It was a goal that staggered the Tribesmen, and gave fresh light to the ancient writing on the Walls of Galway: "From the fury of the O'Flaherties, Good Lord deliver us". Offaly scored twice more for a three-point margin of victory (2-12 to 0-15).

Reverberations in Clareen, 1980 and 1981
On the "domestic" scene, Seir Kieran went down to Kinnitty (1-19 to 3-8) and to Ballyskenagh (4-9 to 4-7) in the 1980 Senior Hurling Championship, and to St Rynagh's (4-16 to 2-7) in 1981. Even so, their contribution to the Faithful County's cause gave a tremendous boost to the profile of the club, and to its grip on the imagination of the rising generation in Clareen. The massive Bob O'Keeffe trophy came to the Seir Kieran National School in March 1981, along with Leinster Championship medal-holders Noel Bergin, Joe Mooney and Eugene Coughlan. Club chairman Tim Mulrooney, Offaly hurling secretary Tony Murphy, and Seamus Mulrooney were in attendance as well. There were even more ebullient scenes when Offaly recorded their famous All Ireland victory over Galway. On the Monday night, preceded by the Mountbolus Pipe Band, the new Champions had a rapturous reception into Emmett Square in Birr. The platform set up for the occasion was a converted articulated trailer provided by Frank Whitten of Clareen. Similar outpourings of pride and acclaim awaited the panel on its tour of the rural hurling strongholds. When they reached Mrs. May Bruce's post office just above the Clareen cross-roads, team captain Pádraig Horan handed the Liam MacCarthy Cup over to Eugene Coughlan, and in that manner the cavalcade arrived in Seir Kieran.

Swash-buckling buccaneers 1982 to 1987

Development of the club facilities
 At the club's AGM in January 1982, Mick Corrigan of the Racepark was asked to chair a committee looking after the Field Development Scheme. By the close of 1982, the club had also built dressing rooms complete with showers and toilets, put a paling around the field, and installed goalposts and nets. The overall effort received welcome recognition in May 1982, in a presentation to Leinster GAA clubs that took place in the Newpark Hotel in Kilkenny. Seir Kieran were nominated as Offaly's "Club of the Year in Section C". Chairman Tim Mulrooney and secretary Mick Murphy accepted the award, and attributed the success to the progress made in promoting underage hurling as much as to the work on the facilities. For example, during the 1981 Féile na nGael event in Birr, Seir Kieran had played host to young hurlers from Antrim whose club chairman subsequently recorded his appreciation:
 "A Chara – I refer to the Offaly Hurling Festival for underage players which was held on the 15th to the 17th of May inclusive. This competition was an outstanding success; the precision-like manner in which it was organized was a tribute to Mick Spain and his able helpers. It was the privilege of my club to have been invited to participate in this Féile and it was most inspiring to see so many juveniles from all over Leinster display the skills of our national game. Our players were the guests of the Seir Kieran Club and its people. I wish to express our sincerest thanks to V. Rev. Seán Collier, PP, Tim Mulrooney and Michael Murphy, Chairman and Secretary respectively of the Seir Kieran Club, and the host families for their extreme kindness. Our players were overjoyed by the reception they received and they will always treasure the weekend they spent in the friendly homes of Clareen. Mise, le meas – Arty Pyke (Chairman)"

A projected rise in population led to an IR£60,000 extension to the Seir Kieran National School, officially opened in March 1983 by Dr Laurence Forrestal, the Bishop of Ossory. The Board of Management at that time consisted of Mrs. Bernie Dooley, Mrs. Nóirín Coakley, Mrs. Mary Mulrooney, and Mr. Jack Ryan. A year later, the redeveloped GAA pitch was officially opened on Monday 4 June 1984. The Minor hurlers of Offaly and Galway provided the curtain-raiser for a "friendly" between the Senior teams of Offaly and Clare (which the visitors won by 1-12 to 1-11). John Dowling, a future GAA president, gave the keynote speech. "The time has now come", said Mr. Dowling, "for Seir Kieran to promote Gaelic Games on a higher scale than ever before".

County Semi-Finalists 1984; County Finalists 1985 and 1987
On 2 October 1983, a Seir Kieran juvenile selection coached by Michael Connolly (Kinnitty) beat St Saran's in the final of the Offaly U-16 Shield. Birr's Brother Vincent presented the trophy to team captain Kieran Dooley. The following year, a school team captained by Mark Featherstone won the Bord na Scol competition, and got medals specially engraved for the GAA Centenary Year. A "back to back" Bord na Scol title came in 1985 (when Kieran Abbott was captain), and the team received medals presented by Offaly football's goalkeeping hero Martin Furlong. It was a foretaste of success to come with St Brendan's Community School; with the Offaly Minors and Seniors; and with the Seir Kieran Club itself.

 In their crunch SHC encounter with Coolderry in 1982, Seir Kieran were still leading with ten minutes to go, when they ran out of steam (Coolderry 4-13, Seir Kieran 3-7). Seir Kieran were generally in better shape in 1983. On 29 May, Eugene Coughlan (2-5) and rising Offaly star Joe Dooley (3-1) powered a victory over Killeigh. However, they were beaten by Lusmagh at Rath on 17 July, meaning that the third round match against Coolderry would again be make-or-break. This one ended at 11 points apiece, and the replay on 7 August also finished all square (1-12 to 1-12). Coolderry shaded it extra time by 2-19 to 3-15. The three Clareen goals were scored by Eugene Coughlan, Seamus Coakley and Martin Breslin; nonetheless that was curtains so far as 1983 was concerned. Seir Kieran opened their 1984 SHC campaign with a stunning 3-18 to 2-4 victory over Drumcullen. The second round was at Rath, where Lusmagh went down by 2-10 to 0-9. In the third round against Kinnitty, 16 points (half from frees) were not enough as the reigning champions racked up 3-12, to advance to the last four. A second semi-final slot was now up for grabs between Seir Kieran and Shinrone. This play-off was delayed until 9 September 1984. Joe Dooley scored nine points of a 0-14 to 1-5 victory, as Seir Kieran advanced to their first Senior Semi-final since 1954. As crafty and battle-hardened as ever, St Rynagh's overcame a Clareen team who were on top for long periods, but were not fit enough to close it out. Trailing 1-10 to 1-4 in the second half, the Shannonsiders hit an unanswered 1-5 to pip them at the post.

Seir Kieran's trainer for 1985 was Pat Spain of Kinnitty, a first-rate hurler during his own playing days. There were four other selectors – Sean Dooley, Tony Murphy, Seamus Kealey and Eugene Coughlan. Their first round encounter with St Rynagh's, on 28 April 1985, reversed the verdict of the previous Autumn (Seir Kieran 2-10 St Rynagh's 0-12). However, Seir Kieran again lived dangerously, before clinging on to a lead they had built up early on. The Midland Tribune editor James "Bud" Burke colorfully described the scene:
 "The swash-buckling buccaneers from the good ship Seir Kieran boarded the St Rynagh's prize ship on the windy Rath sward and fighting a strong battle they subdued the opposition. However the defending St Rynagh's lads rallied and looked like repelling all boarders but Seir Kieran held on and finally hoisted the Jolly Roger."

This remained the pattern during Seir Kieran's four subsequent wins in the championship – over St Saran's (2-8 to 2-3); Shinrone (3-7 to 1-7); Drumcullen (3-8 to 2-9); and a (not yet fully amalgamated) Kilcormac/Killoughey team (2-11 to 2-4). The Semi-final took place on 29 September 1985, and Seir Kieran at last defeated Coolderry when it mattered (1-13 to 0-13). Jimmy Connor's goal and several fine Joe Dooley points put them into their first Senior Final in one third of a century. As with Drumcullen in 1952, however, they encountered a Kinnitty side who were not to be denied their three-in-a-row of Offaly Titles. Paddy and Mark Corrigan scored a combined 3-12 of Kinnitty's 3-18, and Seir Kieran only scored 2-8 in reply. It was a chastening experience for the black and amber; but it was clear that their longer-term graph was still pointing upwards. The disappointment was partly assuaged by the All Star Awards won by Eugene Coughlan in both 1984 and 1985 – the first such accolades to come to Seir Kieran. Coughlan was also awarded the 1985 Texaco Sports Star Award for hurling, joining a glittering 1985 line-up including Jack O'Shea (Gaelic football), Dennis Taylor (snooker), Pat Jennings (soccer), Barry McGuigan (boxing), Joey Dunlop (motorcycling), and Sean Kelly (cycling).

Seir Kieran's misfired 1986 SHC campaign was a big setback. A 2-13 to 1-11 defeat to Lusmagh did the main damage to the 1985 County finalists, leaving them dependent on results elsewhere to make it as far as the three-way play-offs. These forlorn hopes did not materialize, leading to some straight talking at the AGM for 1987 (the club's 100th year in business). Eugene Coughlan was appointed trainer, and the selectors were Mick Murphy, Johnny Breslin and Liam Corcoran. It was the Junior panel, selected by Michael Connolly, Tim Mulrooney, Mick Coughlan and Mick Mulrooney, who would bring home silverware in 1987. There were jubilant scenes at Kilcormac on 3 May 1987, when Seir Kieran defeated Daingean and team captain Johnny Breslin lifted the Junior Hurling League Cup. As they had done in 1985, meanwhile, the parish's Senior team reached the County Final undefeated. However, although their defence had become very cohesive, the attack was over-reliant on Joe Dooley. A 2-13 to 0-13 first-round win over Birr was followed by hard-fought victories over St Rynagh's (2-4 to 0-9) and Lusmagh (3-12 to 1-7). Seir Kieran next overcame Kinnitty by 1-14 to 1-11 in the Semi-final in September. Centre back Mick Coughlan's long-range points had a demoralizing effect on Kinnitty. In the County Final itself, however, Seir Kieran again lacked the guile to prevent St Rynagh's move into the lead in the 54th minute. Team captain Noel Bergin and substitute Kieran Dooley had had to go off injured. There were still only three points in it when Eugene Coughlan's late rasper flew just over David Hughes's crossbar, to leave it St Rynagh's 0-11 Seir Kieran 0-9. Defeat felt more devastating even than in the 1985 County Final, because the Clareen men had had the winning of this match.

Re-capturing the Leinster Crown, 1984
Mick Coughlan and Joe Dooley represented Seir Kieran in the Leinster U-21 hurling championship in 1982. Offaly beat Westmeath in Tullamore by 3-15 to 1-7 in the Semi-final, with Coughlan scoring 2-0 and Dooley 0-5. Although Dooley added 0-4 in the Final in Carlow, three rapid-fire Kilkenny goals killed off the match before half time (5-20 to 2-6). In the Leinster Senior Hurling Championship, the reigning champions overcame Wexford by 2-16 to 3-12 in an enthralling and grueling opening round. Offaly showed their composure when Wexford went a goal ahead in the closing stages. Pádraig Horan's brace of pointed frees and Paddy Kirwan's point from play leveled it, then Kirwan sent over the winner from a brilliant sideline cut deep in the shadow of the Cusack Stand. The Semi-final against Laois was another pulsating game, ending all-square at 3-14 apiece. Pat Delaney was misplaced at corner back and Pat Carroll at midfield, and Offaly shot 21 wides. There was no such experimentation in the replay. Eugene Coughlan suppressed Laois full forward PJ Cuddy and also set up many attacks, as Dermot Healy's men won by 2-17 to 0-14. A fortnight later, on 25 July 1982, it was a very confident Offaly team that returned to Croke Park seeking the three-in-a-row of Leinster Titles. This intriguing Offaly-Kilkenny duel settled into a tight and dour affair. Nonetheless Eugene Coughlan, who allowed not an inch to the quick-turning and tricky Liam Fennelly, seemed to epitomize Offaly's cool control of this match.

Eight minutes from full-time, however, when goalie Damien Martin was tracking a Kilkenny ball that seemed to have gone over the end line, the umpire stayed where he was. The referee didn't whistle for a puck-out either. Liam Fennelly deftly flicked the ball to between the posts, where Matt Ruth was arriving to tap to the empty net for the only goal of the game. Con Houlihan subsequently wrote of the umpire: "I doubt the good man enjoyed a hearty dinner last evening". Nonetheless, even from his usual vantage-point on the terraces at the Canal End, Houlihan himself could not definitively say whether the ball had crossed the line. Offaly were still on level terms after conceding the goal, but sent wide from two subsequent frees. Kilkenny scored two late points to re-claim the Bob O'Keeffe Cup by 1-11 to 0-12. It was a bitter derailment for an Offaly side which was then at the peak of its powers.

In March 1983 Aidan "the Boo" Rosney of Birr, collapsed and died while training with his Offaly teammates in Tullamore. He was 19 years old, and one of Offaly hurling's most exciting and stylish prospects. It was a saddened yet determined squad which advanced to the 1983 Leinster Final against the Cats, by virtue of a 1-20 to 0-11 Semi-final win over Dublin. Kilkenny had a more clear-cut 1-17 to 0-13 victory this time, although Offaly's first-time ground hurling was a delight to watch and at no stage were they out of contention. Early in the second half Kilkenny's number 14, Christy Heffernan, switched to left corner forward with Liam Fennelly moving to full forward. Each of the Offaly defence followed his opponent; but with the masterful Eugene Coughlan drawn out of position, Kilkenny now had sea-room. Offaly's own switches in attack did not work out on the day, and Paddy Corrigan's goal was disallowed. In a re-run of 1982, Kilkenny would go on to defeat Cork in the 1983 All Ireland Final.

Eugene Coughlan, Joe Dooley, Noel Bergin and Mick Coughlan were the four Clareen men on the Offaly Senior panel for the 1984 campaign, which began on 17 June with a 2-11 to 1-11 Leinster Semi-final win over Dublin. Pat Delaney was out through injury, resulting in the Offaly defence being under constant pressure. Joe Dooley, who otherwise would have started, was also injured. Padraig Horan was just back from his unsuccessful run for the Dáil seat left vacant by the untimely death of Mr. Ber Cowen (which was won by the late T.D.'s son Mr. Brian Cowen, a future Taoiseach). Horan didn't score himself but he did unsettle the Dublin defence. In the second half Eugene Coughlan was taken off injured and a fighting Dublin side finally began to make inroads. However the Sky Blue challenge deflated after their second penalty was stopped, lifted and cleared by Aidan Fogarty, all in the one fluid motion in the teeth of the charging Dubs.

In the thrilling Offaly v Wexford Leinster Senior Hurling Final on 8 July 1984, Joe Dooley made his Championship debut and scored 0-2. In all, nine Offaly players found the range, each score proving vital to a 1-15 to 2-11 victory. The decisive goal was scored by Padraig Horan. For Wexford, one point was all that Tony Doran was able to prise out of the rock-like and imperturbable Eugene Coughlan at number 3. Coughlan, as well as midfielder Tom Conneely (St Rynagh's), got a particularly rousing reception when the new Leinster Champions arrived in Birr at midnight. This form was continued in a 4-15 to 1-10 All Ireland Semi-final win over Galway (5 August 1984 at Thurles). Joachim Kelly's power and pace at midfield set the tempo. Joe Dooley's 2-3 made him top scorer, but overall this was an emphatic team performance; and Offaly were seen as having the edge ahead of the Centenary All Ireland against Cork. The unaccustomed "favorites" tag did not sit well with the team management. Mindful of Cork's great comeback in the Munster Final, Tony Murphy queried: "Just how good were Galway? If I knew that I'd be happier."

On 2 September 1984, Cork comprehensively won the All Ireland Final by 3-16 to 1-12. Offaly's scorers were Mark Corrigan (1-2), Pat Carroll and Pat Delaney (0-4 each), and Padraig Horan (0-2). Denis Mulcahy kept Joe Dooley well shackled (although, of the 32 hurlers in action that day, Dooley alone would take part in the brace of classic Offaly v Cork All Ireland Semi-finals at the close of the Century.) Seanie O'Leary (2-1),John Fenton (0-7) and Tony O'Sullivan (0-6) were the chief scorers for Cork, and they did the main damage when Offaly faded out in the third quarter. Eugene Coughlan kept Jimmy Barry-Murphy scoreless (ensuring that he would be nominated for Seir Kieran's first All Star Award that Autumn). Nonetheless, it was a somber and downcast Offaly panel that departed Semple Stadium. Their County saw things differently. "WELCOME HOME TO OFFALY'S OWN HEROES", ran the Midland Tribune's banner headline over a picture of a thronged and appreciative Emmett Square that night.

Re-capturing the McCarthy Cup, 1985
The disappointments of Offaly's previous three campaigns, coupled with the continued belief of their supporters, made for an uncommon determination to win back the McCarthy Cup in 1985. Even so, they nearly lost the opening round of the Leinster Championship on 23 June, which ended Offaly 3-18, Kilkenny 3-18. Pat Delaney at centre back did most to hold Offaly together in the first half, while Mark Corrigan's 1-2 made him Offaly's top scorer from play. Nonetheless, when Christy Heffernan palmed the ball past Offaly's new custodian Jim Troy (Lusmagh) to put Kilkenny up 3-11 to 1-8, the Leinster Crown seemed to be slipping away. Only then did the defending champions (including Seir Kieran's Eugene Coughlan, Joe Dooley and Mick Coughlan) pull out all the stops. From a free awarded outfield and to the left, Paddy Corrigan caught Kilkenny napping by going for goal and making it. With a quarter of an hour to go, Pat Delaney lifted another massive free, doubled on by Joachim Kelly for a beautiful goal that set up the most gripping of grandstand finishes. Although Kilkenny regained the lead, another coolly taken Paddy Corrigan free tied it up. The replay on 14 July was another thrilling and sparkling game, with the difference that Offaly kept the whip hand throughout. Eugene Coughlan blotted out Christy Heffernan, Aidan Fogarty kept tabs on Liam Fennelly, while Pat Fleury also reasserted himself. Offaly won by 1-20 to 0-17, and their scorers were Paddy Corrigan (1-11, 0-7 frees), Pat Carroll (0-3), Pat Cleary (0-3), Mark Corrigan (0-2) and Danny Owens (0-1).

 This was only the second time in a century that Kilkenny had been locked out of consecutive Leinster Finals, and the first time since 1948 that both Kilkenny and Wexford were gone before mid-July. The Leinster Final took place between Offaly and Laois on 21 July 1985, and resulted in an Offaly victory by 5-15 to 0-17. Dermot Healy's selection exuded confidence and dominated in every sector, especially at full back where Eugene Coughlan restricted Laois's PJ Cuddy to a single point. When Offaly had taken to the field the old Stadium shook with cheers. Laois had tremendous support as well, and went down fighting. Offaly's captain Pat Fleury took the Bob O'Keeffe Cup over to Matt Connor immediately. 25-year-old Connor, perhaps the Faithful County's most outstanding footballer of all time, had been badly hurt in a car crash on Christmas Day 1984.

On 3 August 1985, the Leinster Champions went to Monaghan Town, preparatory to their All Ireland Semi-final encounter, across the border in Armagh City, the following day. Weather conditions were atrocious, although this did not impede Offaly's emphatic victory over Antrim (3-17 to 0-12). Pat Carroll lined out at number 11, but was soon replaced by Declan Fogarty. (This would turn out to be the last glimpse of Pat Carroll on the hurling field). In Croke Park, 90 miles to the south, Galway were meanwhile de-throning the Rebels in a pulsating game, setting up a repeat of the classic decider of 1981. The Final took place at GAA Headquarters on 1 September, and saw Galway tearing into the game at a frantic pace, only to squander many scoring chances. Ten of Galway's 19 wides came in the opening 20 minutes. Having absorbed ferocious pressure, Offaly settled into their own game-plan. Eugene Coughlan kept Galway full forward Noel Lane from repeating the damage Lane had done against Cork. Brendan Bermingham effectively marked another of Galway's Semi-final stars, 21-year-old Tony Keady (who had lost his father that August). Padraig Horan at full forward distributed very effectively, and the other Offaly forwards tacked on points when it mattered. Midway through the first half, Joe Dooley raced in to hand-pass past Galway custodian Peter Murphy, only for it to be adjudged a square infringement. However, Pat Cleary darted through to score two crucial goals, the second of which (early in the second half) seemed to put Offaly in the driving seat. Then PJ Molloy at wing forward and Joe Cooney at midfield initiated a comeback by the Tribesmen. When Michael "Hopper" McGrath lobbed a ball in, Molloy leapt highest before rifling a sublime goal to the roof of the net. Another Galway goal, from Joe Cooney's long-range effort, was not given when Jim Troy let fly to clear the ball from just inside his goal-line. Brendan Keeshan was introduced to take on Cooney. The mentors made wholesale switches in the closing stages, and Offaly emerged victorious by 2-11 to 1-12.

The Irish Independent deemed the two-point winning margin to be "a fair and factual summary of seventy minutes of hazard and hope." Dermot Healy said that he had had no doubts, because "the attitude was right". In evoking the absence through illness of Pat Carroll, Offaly County Board chairman Paudge Mulhare said: "You have won an All Ireland for Pat. This is for him and I thank you for that." The McCarthy Cup's return to the Faithful County was as memorable as it had been four years before, not least in Seir Kieran where the Offaly panel (including four parishioners, Eugene and Mick Coughlan, Joe Dooley and Joe Mooney) had a raucous reception on Tuesday, 3 September 1985. Over the following two years, there would be equally heartening triumphs at Colleges and Minor level, and Clareen players would feature in each case.

Lifting the Dr. Croke Cup and the Irish Press Cup, 1986 and 1987
The passing of Pat Carroll in March 1986, at the age of 30, came as a big blow to Coolderry and to Offaly. It also signified the break-up of the team that had delivered four Leinster and two All Ireland Titles in six short years. Offaly remained a force to be reckoned with, however, and in June 1986 they beat Laois by 1-23 to 4-9 to qualify for the Leinster Final. When Laois began to get the upper hand, Joe Dooley was switched to midfield and turned in a "man of the match" performance. The same tactic was not effective in the Final itself. With Jim Troy and Aidan Fogarty out through injury, League champions Kilkenny swamped the Offaly defence and won their 51st Leinster Title by 4-11 to 1-11. Only 0-5 of the Offaly total came from play. Pat Delaney's twice-taken penalty closed the gap to five points, but this would be Offaly's last score. Pádraig Horan's retirement the following winter opened another gap in Offaly's attack formation.

Apart from Martin Hanamy (St Rynagh's) and Seamus Coughlan (Kinnitty) the Faithful County had few fresh faces to call on for the 1987 campaign. On 31 May 1987, Offaly showed craft and character to beat Dublin (2-18 to 1-13), exemplified by Joe Dooley's left-handed swing connecting to score the decisive goal – but the team failed to score in the last 18 minutes. Similarly, Laois had Offaly on the rack for much of the Semi-final. Jim Troy had to be brilliant between the posts. Eugene Coughlan and Aidan Fogarty combined well under heavy pressure, as the Faithful County won out (1-16 to 0-13). 29,133 spectators were in Croke Park when Offaly contested their eighth Leinster Final in a row in warm August sunshine. They were chronically short of attack options and only scored 0-3 after the break. For Kilkenny, Christy Heffernan almost single-handedly dislocated Offay's half back line. Liam Fennelly's goal and midfielder Ger Fennelly's hail of points ensured that the Cats prevailed by 2-14 to 0-17. While it was demoralising to have lost the Leinster Final twice in a row, the success being garnered by Offaly's youth teams held out the prospect of better days to come.

Seir Kieran's Ger Connors was corner back on the St Brendan's Community School team that reached the 1985 All Ireland Colleges Senior Final, losing to the North Monastery in a replay (4-11 to 1-5). The Community School went one better in 1986, with a stunning 5-8 to 1-8 victory over "the North Mon" in the All Ireland Final, played out on 27 April 1986 at Portlaoise. Billy Dooley (1-1) and Aidan Mulrooney represented Seir Kieran. Team captain Michael Hogan (Birr) lifted the Dr. Croke Cup. The captaincy passed to Billy Dooley the following year. In the Leinster Colleges Final against St Kieran's College Kilkenny, played at Portlaoise on 22 March 1987, a gallant St Brendan's team were beaten by 4-8 to 3-9. Billy Dooley scored 1-7 and his younger brother Johnny scored 1-0. Johnny Pilkington of Birr scored another goal, while Brian Whelahan, also of Birr, was corner forward. For the Kilkenny boys, Adrian Ronan lined out at corner forward while D.J. Carey came on as a substitute in the second half.

The Community School provided the bulk of the Offaly team that won the All Ireland Minor Hurling Final in 1986. The first round against Kilkenny resulted in a 2-8 to 2-8 draw. A breathtaking replay on 1 June saw Offaly prevail by 3-9 to 4-5. Having beaten Dublin 2-10 to 0-7 in the Semi-final, Offaly won their first Leinster Minor title on 13 July 1986 against Wexford (4-7 to 1-5). The All Ireland Semi-final against Galway (10 August at Thurles) was another wonderful match, which went down to the wire despite the more comfortable-looking 3-13 to 2-10 score-line. It was back to Croke Park on 7 September, where Offaly triumphed over Cork by 3-12 to 3-9 to claim the Irish Press Cup. After 20 minutes Cork's Rory O'Connor was red-carded for a second bookable offence, yet Cork might still have won. It took sublime finishing by Declan Pilkington to beat the Rebel goalie Paddy Barry. In the end, though, a spirited Offaly side deserved their victory. At the Seir Kieran buffet in the County Arms Hotel in February 1987, presentations were made to Billy Dooley and Aidan Mulrooney on having brought to the club its first All Ireland hurling medals at the Colleges and Minor grades.

Offaly successfully defended their Minor Title the following year. Billy Dooley scored three lovely points from play in Offaly's 3-16 to 2-9 win over Wexford. Damage to the Croke Park pitch, sustained during a U2 concert that summer, led to the postponement of the Leinster Minor Final. In the interim, Offaly deployed four of their Minor panel in the Under-16 Hurling Championship at Nowlan Park – a day-long 15-a-side "blitz" competition starting with nine teams. With Johnny Dooley and Kevin Kinahan of Seir Kieran, Offaly won out this U-16 All Ireland by beating Kilkenny North 1-4 to 0-1. When the Leinster Minor Final against Kilkenny did go ahead, at Croke Park on 2 August 1987, Offaly's fast-moving and nippy team gave a great display in which not one of them stood back, and were utterly deserving of their 2-13 to 0-12 victory. Billy Dooley at centre forward scored 1-0, while Johnny Dooley lined out beside him at left half forward. The All Ireland Semi-final took place two weeks later at Dundalk, where Offaly beat Antrim by 4-17 to 1-4. Johnny Dooley and goalie John Troy were the only non-Birr players in a "magnificent seven" Offaly defenders. (Dooley was switched to the forwards in the second half).

In the All Ireland Minor Hurling Final on 6 September 1987, Offaly beat Tipperary by 2-8 to 0-12, to become the first Minor hurlers since Cork in 1978/9 to put All Ireland titles back-to-back. Johnny Dooley lined out at left half back, while Billy Dooley started at centre forward but scored 0-2 when switched to wing forward. When Tipperary stretched their lead early in the second half, Offaly never let their heads drop and their direct first-time hurling eventually paid off. Thomas Moylan the captain hoisted the Irish Prress Cup, which the team took on a slow "victory march" through the County. They were mobbed at Edenderry, Daingean, Tullamore, Kilcormac and finally Birr, where Paudge Mulhare said that Offaly hurling's future had never looked so bright as it did that day.

Lifting the Sean Robbins Cup – Seir Kieran in 1988

NHL and Leinster Championship, spring and summer 1988
The National Hurling League of 1987/88 again featured three Seir Kieran players, Eugene Coughlan, Mick Coughlan and Joe Dooley. Starting out in Division 2, Offaly beat Laois in Birr in October 1987 (3-11 to 0-11) then beat Dublin in Tullamore in November (2-8 to 0-6). Big wins over Roscommon and Kerry preceded the Christmas break, then a similarly lop-sided game against Westmeath (5-11 to 1-3) on 23 February 1988 put Offaly into the League Quarter-final. The Westmeath game saw Eugene Coughlan play in the forwards for Offaly for the first time since May 1980. Although the same switch did not work so well in the Quarter-final in March, Offaly had an unexpected 2-11 to 1-13 victory over Galway, the reigning League and All Ireland champions. Mark Corrigan sent over a point in the last minute to clinch this match. At the Semi-final on 10 April 1988, Wexford seemed to be in pole position after scoring two second half goals, but Offaly kept snapping at their heels. For the crucial equalizing goal, Pat O'Connor (Coolderry) sent up the right wing where Ronald Byrne (Lusmagh) doubled on the ball to send to Eugene Coughlan. Coughlan gathered and passed over his head to Joe Dooley, who coolly netted a low shot. Offaly won out by 2-16 to 3-11, to reach only their second League Final.

On 24 April 1988, Offaly went down to Tipperary in what was still a thrilling and memorable League Final. Eugene Coughlan was the only Offaly forward to score from play, in contrast to Tipp's spread of scoring forwards. Joe Dooley lined out beside Joachim Kelly at midfield. Aidan Fogarty did well on Nicholas English. Corner back Martin Hanamy (St Rynagh's) consolidated his first team status, as did Michael Duignan (also St Rynagh's) when he was brought on. Mick Coughlan at centre back was having a great game on Donie O'Connell, then he was injured and replaced by PJ Martin. Tipperary were up by 2-13 to 0-8 when Eugene Coughlan finished to the net. A couple of minutes later Mark Corrigan fired a second major when Joachim Kelly was brought down; and Ken Hogan's goal survived other close calls. Tipperary lifted the siege and themselves added 1-2, for a final score-line of 3-15 to 2-9.

In the Leinster Senior Hurling Semi-final, Offaly looked in trouble for long spells against Dublin, but had the skill and experience to win by 2-13 to 2-10. The Offaly goals were scored by Joe Dooley and Declan Fogarty. Offaly had given much to ponder ahead of their ninth consecutive Leinster Final appearance, this time against Wexford. On 10 July 1988, Offaly showed grit, character and great passion to seal their fifth Leinster Title, by 3-12 to 1-14. Mick Coughlan's inspirational catches epitomized the superiority of the defence. Eugene Coughlan's height at the edge of the square caused the Wexford rearguard much anxiety, while Joe Dooley's two goals made him top scorer. The subsequent All Ireland Semi-final on 7 August 1988 resulted in defeat to Galway (Galway 3-18, Offaly 3-11). The Tribesmen picked off points from everywhere and 3-14 of their total came from play (compared to Offaly's 2-5). Even so, a brace of Pat Delaney goals brought Offaly right back into contention in the closing stages; but they failed to tack on the points.

Seir Kieran, Senior Hurling Champions 1988
Seir Kieran in 1988 were managed by 24-year-old Joe Dooley (trainer), Johnny Breslin, Liam Corcoran and Mick Murphy. The Juniors (trained by John Joe Coffey) beat Daingean to retain the League Cup they had won in 1987, and Billy Kennedy the Junior captain received the Cup from Tony Murphy the Offaly Hurling Secretary. The Seniors made it a League double on Saturday 7 May, when they beat Drumcullen in the Final by 2-14 to 1-9. This was an excellent game, played at championship pace throughout. Two rounds of the 1988 Offaly SHC had been played off before the inter-county championships. Seir Kieran had won against Lusmagh by 3-13 to 1-16 but lost against St Rynagh's by 2-15 to 2-9. The black and amber had their chances in the Banagher game, but accuracy was a problem. The selectors used practice matches, such as the one against Castletowngeoghegan at Durrow, to sharpen up their side. When the domestic championship resumed on 13 August, a hard-fought 3-16 to 4-4 win over Coolderry kept the dream alive. Seir Kieran again faced St Rynagh's in the first leg of the resultant three-way play-off. On a resplendent Rath pitch, Seir Kieran reversed the previous verdict by 3-11 to 2-11 and became the first side to reach the last four.

The Semi-final between Seir Kieran and Kinnitty was delayed on account of three events: an early-morning fire in The Greyhound Bar in Birr, which tragically claimed the life of the proprietor John Kennedy, a member of the Seir Kieran Club; Kinnitty's successful appeal against disqualification for not having fulfilled a fixture; and a bereavement affecting the Bergin family of Derrykeale. When the match did go ahead on 9 October, Kinnitty never really recovered from Seir Kieran's 3-1 in the opening minutes, although two goals by Paddy Corrigan and points from Mark Corrigan, Brendan Blake and Pat Delaney got them to within four points. It was the Clareen men who finished the stronger, however, to win by 5-9 to 2-10. Five Seir Kieran forwards – Mick Mulrooney, Johnny Dooley, Joe Dooley, Billy Dooley, and Noel Bergin – got on the scoreboard, as did Mick Coughlan at centre back. The Clareen goalie Liam Coughlan gave a great display, although another big tally of wides remained a cause for concern going into the County Final.

Played out at St Brendan's Park, Birr, on 23 October 1988, between Seir Kieran and St Rynagh's, the 93rd County Final resulted in a four-point black and amber victory (by 3-13 to 4-6 for the Banagher men). The starting line-up was Liam Coughlan, Sean Coughlan, Eugene Coughlan, Paddy Mulrooney, Johnny Abbott, Mick Coughlan (0-1), Ger Connors, Pat Mulrooney (0-1), Kieran Dooley, Johnny Dooley (0-3), Jimmy Connor, Noel Bergin, Mick Mulrooney (1-0), Joe Dooley (0-4) and Billy Dooley (2-4). For the Shannonsiders, Fintan Dolan scored 2-3, Declan Fogarty 2-0, and Michael Duignan converted three frees. In one of the key individual tussles, Kieran Dooley curbed Duignan's influence at midfield. Overall, Seir Kieran had the speed, skill, spirit and determination to become the tenth club to claim the Offaly Title, and the first new name on the Trophy since St Rynagh's themselves in 1965.

Club of the Year
It fell to Eugene Coughlan to lift the Sean Robbins Cup on behalf of his 101-year-old club, presented to him by Mr. Brendan Ward who was then vice chairman of the County Board. The captain's acceptance speech paid tribute to the entire panel of players, their selectors, the club officials, the supporters who had been with the team through all the highs and lows, and especially the team trainer Joe Dooley. Celebrations in Clareen continued until well into the following week, with almost everything else put on hold. Messages of congratulation poured in from the parish's diaspora and many others, while the Bishop of Ossory, Dr. Forrestal, drove up from Kilkenny to convey his congratulations in person. Two weeks later, in their very first match in the Leinster Club Hurling Championship, Seir Kieran beat the Meath champions Trim by 2-14 to 0-6. The Leinster Club Semi-final took place on Saturday 20 November at Geraldine Park, Athy, where Buffers Alley of Wexford knocked out the Offaly champions by 1-12 to 1-7. The leg injury that affected Joe Dooley was a factor, but a bigger factor in Seir Kieran's defeat was the large number of frees early on that they failed to convert. Notwithstanding this sequel, winning its first Senior county championship made 1988 an epochal year in the club's history. At the Offaly GAA Convention for 1989, Pat Grogan the Seir Kieran chairman accepted the accolade of "Club of the Year".

There was further celebration the following St. Kieran's Day, 5 March 1989, when Dr. Forrestal announced to thunderous applause that Fr. Seán Collier was being made Canon of the Cathedral Chapter of St. John's, Kilkenny. The new Canon, 21 years in Seir Kieran, was left speechless. Two years later, On 21 April 1991, Fr. Seán died suddenly and unexpectedly. The first president of the Seir Kieran GAA Club, the Canon had been born in Portlaoise in 1917 and ordained on 8 June 1941. Initially posted to the Diocese of Hexham and Newcastle (England), he returned home at Christmas 1945 and became curate then Administrator of St John's Parish, Kilkenny. Transferred to Seir Kieran as Administrator in 1968, he was made Parish Priest in 1982. As the first incumbent PP to die in Seir Kieran since the 1830s, he was interred on Bell Hill beside the church. Dr. Forrestal led the Requiem Mass, and termed the grief of the parishioners "a genuine expression of love and respect for a parish priest who was loyal to them and had served with them to the end."

Five years of frustration, 1989 to 1993

The County Finals of 1989 and 1991
Seir Kieran retained their Senior Hurling League title in 1989, beating Lusmagh on 14 May by 3-13 to 1-10. Since the inception of the SHL, the winners had always gone on to win the championship as well. However, this was not the way it turned out in 1989, and it was Lusmagh who would emerge on top in October. The Clareen side started the championship with wins over Kinnitty (28 May), and Kilcormac/Killoughey (17 September, by a two-point margin), which was enough to qualify for the Semi-finals – and to make the last match in the group stages just a formality. This third-round game took place against St Rynagh's on 24 September. Two goals from Pat Mahon and 0-7 from Johnny Dooley meant that Seir Kieran led for most of the way, until Declan Fogarty's last-minute goal swung it (St Rynagh's 3-9, Seir Kieran 3-8). In the Semi-final against Birr, Seir Kieran contained Birr dangerman Ray Landy reasonably well, until Landy scored the townsmen's only goal two minutes from time (Seir Kieran 3-10, Birr 1-9). In the Final on 22 October 1989, an exciting game of great intensity teetered first one way and then another. Lusmagh scored 0-6 from play in the last 20 minutes, to cut the defending champions' lead to two points. In the last minute of play, John Kelly scored a goal for the Reds. Pat Horan blew the long whistle soon after, and Lusmagh (trained by Joachim Kelly and captained by Jim Troy) had deservedly won their first Title by 1-11 to 1-10.

Seir Kieran reached the Senior Hurling League Final for the third time in succession on 22 April 1990, only to lose by four points to a fast-maturing Birr side. The black and amber also failed to qualify for the last stages of the 1990 Senior Hurling Championship. A 0-12 to 0-10 loss to St Rynagh's in the opening round was made up for by impressive wins over Birr (2-13 to 0-10) and Kinnitty (4-15 to 0-11). However, Birr had regrouped to beat St Rynagh's and force a three-way play-off, involving those two teams and Seir Kieran. In the first leg of this play-off, on 18 September 1990 at Rath, Birr shocked Seir Kieran by 0-12 to 1-6 to qualify for the Semi-finals. Liam Coughlan the goalkeeper gave the one flawless display, in a Clareen defence much more troubled than for a long time past. The losers had to play St Rynagh's again on 23 September, with the other Semi-final slot at stake. Despite seeming to be in control for most of the way, Seir Kieran conceded 1-3 in the last four minutes and were eliminated by 2-9 to 1-10.

Seir Kieran signaled that they were still contenders in 1991 with an opening round 2-12 to 1-8 win over Coolderry. Kevin Kinahan was centre back, and his commanding display led to his selection for the Offaly U-21 hurling team that year. In the second round on 20 July, Seir Kieran also had a big win (3-14 to 0-6) over Tullamore. The Offaly County Board postponed the third round of SHC games, in order to allow Seir Kieran's Johnny Dooley, Lusmagh's John Troy, and Birr's Brian Whelahan and Johnny Pilkington to participate in the U-21 Shinty international against Scotland. (This match was played at Limerick on 27 July 1991,when Ireland and Scotland scored six goals apiece.) Seir Kieran's third-round clash with Birr eventually went ahead on 17 August, and finished Birr 1-17 Seir Kieran 0-8. Birr also had 18 wides as Seir Kieran were out-played in every sector. In their resulting play-off game (14 September at Rath), Seir Kieran bounced back to win by 2-17 to Coolderry's 1-10. In the Semi-final against Lusmagh on 30 September, the black and amber won a tense encounter by 1-13 to 0-12. The County Final took place on 13 October 1991, and the persistent drizzle did not impede a high-standard game with plenty of direct first-time hurling. Seir Kieran capitalized on their early opportunities, but Birr made the crucial switches which forced the Clareen men onto the defensive for most of the second half. It was still deadlocked in the last minute, when the Birr goalkeeper (Paddy Kirwan from Ballyskenagh) came forward to convert the 65' free to make it Birr 1-12, Seir Kieran 1-11. Of the five County Finals that they had contested in the past seven years, Seir Kieran had now lost four.

Seir Kieran continued to have success in other grades. In November 1989 the following panel – including several from Killavilla, with whom Seir Kieran were joined for the purposes of under-age hurling – defeated Ballyskenagh to win the Juvenile (U-16) 'B' Hurling Title: Finbarr Murphy, Ray Fitzpatrick, Owen Breslin, Damien Coffey, Aidan O'Neill, Damien Murphy (captain), Neville Phelan, Kevin Abbott, John Dooley, Pat Grogan, Stephen Coakley, Roy Makim, Paul Scully, John Coakley, TJ Dooley, Peter Breslin, Michael Carroll, Joe Guinan, Tadhg Mulrooney, Kieran Kealey (goalie), Ollie Fitzpatrick, and James Coakley. The team was trained by Michael Corrigan. The club's morale was also lifted by continuing to punch above its weight during Offaly hurling's Minor, U-21, NHL, and Leinster Championship campaigns of 1989, 1990 and 1991.

Offaly hurling in transition, 1989 and 1990
Having gone down badly to Kilkenny in the Leinster Minor Hurling Final of 1988 (when Aidan Mulrooney and Johnny Dooley represented Seir Kieran), the Offaly Minors proved unstoppable the following year, beating Wexford and Dublin to qualify for a re-match against the Cats in the Leinster Final (9 July 1989). This was a great, fast and open game and ended at 14 points apiece. Offaly won the replay at Portlaoise by 4-13 to 0-13. Kevin Flynn (2), Raymond Dooley and Ronan McNamara were the goal-scorers, while a Kilkenny attack that included Charlie Carter failed to beat John Troy. In the All Ireland Semi-final, Offaly lived dangerously against a fast and skillful Down team, before winning by 1-11 to 1-5. They had sharpened up considerably by the first Sunday in September, and triumphed over Clare (2-16 to 1-12) for the Faithful County's third Minor Title in four years. Brian Whelahan was captain. Offaly played almost to exhibition standard at times, although Clare proved a tough nut to crack. Niall Hand goaled for Offaly after four minutes, and again just before half time when Davy Fitzgerald the Clare custodian failed to cut out Adrian Cahill's pass. Cahill himself scored 0-3, as did Oisin O'Neill, while Raymond Dooley (line-ball) and Ronan McNamara each contributed 0-1. Johnny Dooley scored 0-8, bringing his tally over the entire campaign to 42 points (of which 24 had been from placed balls).

In between these Minor games, Dooley had been teaming up with his brother Billy on the Offaly U-21 hurling panel, who came up just short against Tipperary in the 1989 All Ireland Final. Pat Joe Whelahan coached both the U-21 and the Senior hurlers that year. Offaly had first beaten Westmeath (6-19 to 0-6), and then Laois (2-11 to 1-9) in the Leinster Semi-final. John Troy's bravura performance in the Offaly goals kept Laois at bay. On 23 July 1989 at Portlaoise, Offaly defeated Kilkenny by 3-16 to 3-9 for their first Leinster U-21 Title since their breakthrough eleven years before. Offaly looked like they might be caught when DJ Carey got Kilkenny's third goal, but they outscored the Cats from then on. There was no such suspense in the All Ireland Semi-final on 20 August, when Offaly exacted a measure of revenge on Antrim (5-18 to 0-9) for the shock defeat of the Senior hurlers. On 10 September 1989, some 35,000 patrons thronged O'Moore Park for the All Ireland U-21 Hurling Final. A Tipperary team that included Liam Sheedy and John Leahy won by 4-10 to Offaly's 3-11. Billy Dooley scored 1-0 and Johnny Dooley got five points from frees. Tipperary full forward Dan Quirke scored 3-2, of which two goals came shortly before the interval when Offaly full back Damien Geoghegan had been red-carded. The Faithful County almost overturned the Tipp lead in the second half, but in a feverish finale they couldn't quite get there.

In the Leinster Senior Hurling Championship, Offaly beat Laois by 5-14 to 1-10. Nearly all of the veteran defence – Eugene Coughlan, Aidan Fogarty, Ger Coughlan and Pat Delaney – reverted to the positions in which they had won their two All Irelands. Johnny Pilkington made an impressive Senior debut at midfield, alongside Joachim Kelly. Michael Duignan was top scorer on 2-1, and next came Seir Kieran's Joe Dooley on 1-3. Dooley would add 0-3 in the Leinster Final, played on 9 July 1989, which proved to be the margin of victory in the end (Offaly 3-15, Kilkenny 4-9). Mark Corrigan's personal tally of three goals and seven points (0-5 from frees) was the main feature of this match. The Cats hit back for three late goals, but Offaly ended the 1980s as they had begun them – by hanging on for their sixth Leinster Title in ten years.

The second Offaly v Antrim All Ireland Senior Hurling Semi-final took place at Croke Park on 6 August 1989. In what was the shock result in hurling in the 1980s, Antrim won by 4-15 to 1-15. Ger Coughlan of Kinnitty lined out despite the tragic death of  his brother Seamus (a former member of the team) in a drowning accident in Winchester, New York. Each of the team wore a black armband. Eugene Coughlan and Mark Corrigan started for Offaly despite carrying injuries. Even so, it seemed to be business as usual for much of the way, and the Midlanders reached the interval with a 1-10 to 1-6 lead. Antrim switched their burly full forward Ciaran Barr to centre forward, where he grew in influence. Offaly had not envisaged the Glensmen getting a run on them at this stage. Aidan McCarry and Olcan "Cloot" McFetridge swooped for the late goals that buried the Faithful County. In a spur-of-the-moment gesture, Offaly formed a guard of honour as the Glensmen were leaving the pitch. Tipperary would be the opposition in the Final (having narrowly overcome a Galway team still reeling from the so-called "Keady Affair"). Playing in their first All Ireland since 1943, Antrim failed to reproduce what they had shown against Offaly, and lost by 4-24 to 3-9.

Kilkenny were the heavy favorites in the following year's Leinster Semi-final, played at Croke Park on 17 June 1990. Instead, Offaly – coached by Paudge Mulhare, with selectors Tony Murphy, Andy Gallagher, Mick Spain and Willie Gorman – won by 4-15 to 1-8. Now 33, Eugene Coughlan was once again in cool command, denying Liam Fennelly so much as an inch of space or a point on the board. 18-year-old Brian Whelahan likewise kept DJ Carey out of contention. Two other relative newcomers, Michael Duignan and Johnny Pilkington, also epitomized Offaly's never-say-die spirit, although it was the goals from veterans Danny Owens, Joachim Kelly and Pat Cleary that really signified the rout of Kilkenny. The Faithful County advanced to the Leinster Final on 8 July 1990, and claimed the Bob O'Keeffe Cup (by 1-19 to Dublin's 2-11) for a magnificent three-in-a-row, and seven out of the last eleven Leinster Titles.

As in 1988 and 1989, however, Offaly bowed out at the All Ireland Semi-final stage. On 5 August 1990, Galway won by 1-16 to 2-7. At a Garda match in Portlaoise a couple of weeks previously, Joachim Kelly had been stretchered off with severed ligaments to the knee. Kelly's dynamism was sorely missed against a still-powerful Galway combination. Hopper McGrath and a rampant Joe Cooney hit 0-12 between them. Owing to their opponents' collapse at half back and midfield, this was enough to overwhelm what turned out to have been a "last stand" for the Offaly team of the 1980s. Although players such as Jim Troy, Joachim Kelly, Paddy and Mark Corrigan, and especially Joe Dooley would soldier on for the Faithful County, Paudge Mulhare grasped that the Galway defeat signified the turning of the page:
 "You played it hard and clean and before the game we said that if we won we would come back into this dressing room together. We lost and we came in together. You went down like men, and be as proud leaving Croke Park today as you were the last day."

Victory in the NHL, disappointment in U-21 and Leinster SHC, 1991 to 1993
Although the Galway game was Eugene Coughlan's last appearance in the Championship, the Seir Kieran great again answered the call during Offaly's victorious National Hurling League campaign of 1990-91. Johnny Dooley's marksmanship was another key feature of the campaign. Padraig Horan had taken over as Offaly manager at this stage, and he said the aim was simply to win promotion from League Division 2. A good start was made on 28 October 1990 against Antrim in Casement Park (3-7 to 0-11), before Offaly came home to Birr to defeat Laois by 0-19 to 2-8. Danny Owens (Killoughey) got seven of his nine points from frees, while five of Johnny Dooley's six points were from open play. Wins over Meath (0-13 to 0-9) and Derry (5-9 to 0-7) followed in November. The Derry game took place in a miserably wet Slaughtneil, where Seir Kieran's brilliant goalie Liam Coughlan stood in for Jim Troy. Resuming at Salthill on 17 February 1991, Offaly lost to Galway by 1-11 to 0-9, in what was still a good performance. However, their chances of promotion took a real nose-dive with defeat to Down on 3 March (1-14 to 1-9). Results elsewhere fortuitously fell Offaly's way, and the team got back on track by beating Kerry by 0-21 to 0-6. In the play-off at Drogheda on the last day of March, Offaly again met Down and exacted revenge for the earlier defeat (3-13 to 2-7).

The NHL Quarter-final between Offaly and Waterford took place at Thurles on 14 April 1991. This was the first competitive inter-county game in which Joe, Billy and Johnny Dooley (with, respectively, 0-2, 0-1 and 0-4) got on the score-sheet together. A fourth Seir Kieran representative, Liam Coughlan, came on for Jim Troy when the Lusmagh man was elbowed in the eye. Joachim Kelly's return from injury was a big boost to the underdogs, as a very enjoyable match went to extra time. Waterford's training over the winter was supposed to give them the edge in this scenario, but it was Offaly who advanced by 3-14 to 0-14. Tipperary were the opponents in the Semi-final, played at Limerick, and were defeated by 1-7 to 0-7. Five of Offaly's starting forwards – Joe Dooley, Johnny Dooley, Michael Duignan, Danny Owens, and Daithi Regan – scored from play, with Duignan netting the decisive goal four minutes from time. 22,749 patrons came to Croke Park on 12 May for the League Final itself, and saw Offaly become the tenth county to win the League (and the first new name since Waterford in 1963). Wexford were on top for much of the game, but had numerous wides from distance. Offaly showed tenacity, power and raw courage, as they hunted in packs and got the most out of their own chances. With two goals from Dathi Regan (Birr), it finished Offaly 2-6, Wexford 0-10.

While winning the Faithful County's first National Hurling League was a historic achievement, it was a case of "pride comes before a fall" so far as 1991, 1992 and 1993 were concerned. In the Leinster Semi-final on 3 June 1991, Dublin advanced by 0-19 to 1-14 as the reigning Leinster and League champions were sensationally dumped out. The Metropolitans showed greater fitness, alertness and hunger and led most of the way. Johnny Dooley's second-half goal, fired from a 20-metre free, brought Offaly right back into contention, but it was Dublin who got the late scores to clinch it. Not since 1979 had Offaly failed to reach the Leinster Senior Hurling Final, so their supporters reacted to the final whistle with stunned disbelief. Padraig Horan the coach took the view that: "We won our first League and we have the Leinster U-21 Title. Our Senior side is still quite young and the future is bright." However, Offaly's defence of their League Title got off to a rocky start on 19 October 1991, when Down had five points to spare (2-17 to 2-12) to make a memorable debut in League Division 1. Offaly subsequently beat Laois at Rathdowney by 0-11 to 1-3; but lost to both Tipperary (2-17 to 1-7) and Kilkenny (0-12 to 0-10). Kevin Kinahan was full back for the Tipperary game, when Joe, Billy and Johnny Dooley brought the Seir Kieran contingent to four. Survival in Division 1 remained in jeopardy until the team drew with Limerick (Offaly 2-13, Limerick 1-16) at Birr on 22 March 1992. In a fiercely contested tie full of Offaly's old fire, Johnny Dooley's goal and eleven points inspired the team's escape from relegation.

Padraig Horan was happy with the character shown in the Limerick game; but the injury-list meant that the 1992 Leinster Senior Hurling Semi-final would be all-uphill. At Croke Park on 21 June, Kilkenny eliminated Offaly by 2-15 to 1-12. Offaly kept an edge for much of the way, with points from Johnny and Joe Dooley, Brendan Kelly (Lusmagh) and Daithi Regan building on a great goal by Danny Owens. However, sending Michael Duignan on was a mistake, as he was not recovered from ligament trouble and soon had to limp off again. Kilkenny's substitutions worked better, Christy Heffernan's guile eventually giving them the upper hand. Billy Dooley was sent on for Offaly late on, and was unlucky with two goal chances. Padraig Horan's tenure as manager ended with this defeat, and he would be replaced by Limerick's Éamonn Cregan. One year later, on 30 May 1993, Offaly again came off second-best in the first round of the Leinster Senior Hurling Championship (Kilkenny 2-10 Offaly 0-14). Notwithstanding the red card shown for Roy Mannion's challenge on Adrian Ronan, Offaly's never-say-die performance deserved to overturn the reigning All Ireland champions. Michael Walsh (son of goalkeeping legend Ollie Walsh, Kilkenny's coach that year) pulled off great saves from Adrian Cahill and Johnny Dooley. At the other end, John Power was awarded a hotly disputed penalty that DJ Carey sent to the net. At the long whistle, the relief of the Cats was palpable and Cregan's men sank to their knees in despair.
  
Like their Senior counterparts, Offaly's U-21 hurlers went from early triumph to ultimate disappointment in both 1991 and 1992. Seir Kieran's Kevin Kinahan played at full back, while Johnny Dooley was wing forward. The Leinster Semi-final of 1991 ended all-square (Offaly 2-9, Wexford 3-6). Offaly won the replay at Nowlan Park by 1-11 to 1-9. In the Leinster U-21 Hurling Final, played at Portlaoise on 7 August 1991, Offaly sandbagged Kilkenny the reigning champions by 2-10 to 0-12. The mentors took a gamble by putting the erstwhile goalie John Troy at wing forward. This worked out very well, especially as Shinrone's Damien Franks (still a Minor) kept a clean sheet in place of the Lusmagh man. The Offaly defence all gave brilliant displays, especially the hooking of Hubert Rigney (St Rynagh's). Johnny Pilkington the captain received the Sean Robbins Cup (named for the time in which the great Offaly administrator had been chairman of the Leinster Council).

Offalay's All Ireland U-21 Semi-final, played at Drogheda, turned out to be one-way traffic (Offaly 2-19, Antrim 1-8). The All Ireland Final took place at Limerick on 8 September 1991, when Offaly were blown away by Galway (2-17 to 1-9). Kevin Kinahan did noticeably well on Joe Rabbite, until the Galway man was switched to centre forward where he laid off scoring chance after scoring chance. Of the two penalties awarded to Offaly, Johnny Dooley netted the first but opted to put the second over the bar. Although over ten minutes remained, Galway were nearly out of sight by then. Many of the same U-21 panel were still eligible the following year. At Portlaoise on 28 June 1992, Johnny Dooley scored ten points against a Dublin side that were in contention all the way. Offaly were leading 0-14 to 0-11 with time almost up, when Pauric Tiernan's long-range effort cracked off the crossbar and over to leave it a close shave. Dooley added 0-9 in Offaly's great 1-15 to 2-10 Leinster Final win over the Cats; and 0-11 when the Midlanders had revenge on Galway in the Semi-final (Offaly 3-17, Galway 1-5). The All Ireland U-21 Hurling Final took place between Waterford and Offaly on 13 September 1992, when over 21,000 enthralled patrons crammed into Nowlan Park. It ended all-square (Offaly 0-16, Waterford 4-4) after a riveting game replete with some brilliant scores and some outrageous wides. The Deise's goalie Ray Barry was their hero of the hour, while midfielder Johnny Brenner scored all of Waterford's four points. In the second half, the Deise scored four goals (three of them by big Sean Daly). The last of these had Offaly chasing the game, until Brian Whelahan raced forward for the equalizer just on full-time. The replay took place two weeks later and was another non-stop display of pure hurling. At its end, however, it was Waterford who were victorious by 0-12 to 2-3. Empty-handed once more, after their third U-21 Final in four years, Kevin Kinahan, Johnny Dooley and all of their teammates were inconsolable.

County Championships of 1992 and 1993
Seir Kieran would likewise emerge empty-handed from the following two SHC seasons, and seemed to be sliding backwards at times. They began the 1992 championship in Jekyll & Hyde fashion, with a stunning 4-10 to 2-9 victory over Coolderry then a desolate 1-13 to 0-7 loss to Birr. In the third round against Kinnitty, Mick Mulrooney scored the decisive goal as Seir Kieran won by 1-9 to 0-11, although they had lived dangerously throughout this match. The next outing was on 9 August 1992, when the Clareen team beat Kilcormac/ Killoughey by 2-16 to 0-7 to guarantee a place in the play-offs. Neither could Coolderry really cope with Seir Kieran fully nine weeks later, when they duked it out for a Semi-final place. With Pat O'Connor out with a broken leg, Coolderry had few attacking options and went down by 0-13 to 1-7. On the minus side, the black and amber had 13 wides. St Rynagh's were the opposition in the SHC Semi-final, played at Birr on 24 October 1992, and never relinquished the lead after Aidan Fogarty took an opportunist goal (St Rynagh's 2-14, Seir Kieran 1-12).

Seir Kieran also played six matches in the 1993 Senior Hurling Championship, but did not even make the Semi-finals this time. A nail-biting one-point win over Kilcormac/ Killoughey (1-13 to 1-12) was negated by a defeat to Birr by 2-13 to 2-9. Noel Bergin reacted quickest when James Coakley's shot came off the post, but Robbie Sheils's net lived a charmed life after that. Brian Whelahan converted two 65's for a telling advantage. At Rath on 13 June, Seir Kieran and Lusmagh played out a draw (Seir Kieran 2-6, Lusmagh 1-9). Victories followed against Tullamore (0-12 to 1-8) and against Drumcullen (1-15 to 0-11), but these were insufficient to avoid the play-offs. On 15 August 1993, the rampant Reds took two early goals to all but end it as a contest, and went on for a six-point victory (Lusmagh 4-12, Seir Kieran 1-15). It was a fittingly miserable end to what had been five years of failure in the quest to win back the Sean Robbins Cup.

Four years of achievement, 1994 to 1997

Reaching the County Final again – Seir Kieran in 1994
While the Clareen side's reversals of fortune since 1988 were brutal, a major reason for them was that the Offaly domestic championship had become one of the most competitive in the country. Birr were waxing in strength, St Rynagh's and Lusmagh were always there or thereabouts, and Kilcormac/ Killoughey and now Tullamore had plenty of talent coming through. The Clareen mentors and panel would eventually prove equal to this challenge, going on to contest four County Finals in a row between 1994 and 1997 – and to win two of those. As they had in 1987 and 1988, the Junior hurlers led the way in 1994, beating Killeigh/ Killeen, Belmont and Tubber (walkover) and then Daingean in the Quarter-final. The Semi-final, played at Raheen in September, finished Seir Kieran 3-6, Killurin 0-7. The Clareen side, coached by Michael Murphy with selectors Tommy Hynes and TJ Dooley, gave a brave account of themselves in the Junior 'B' Hurling Final, played at Rath on 9 October 1994. Kilcormac/ Killoughey were too strong on the day, and won out by 2-11 to 0-10.

Before several of the panel were called up for Offaly's brilliant summer Blitzkrieg, the club's Senior team had made a highly encouraging start in the 1994 SHC, defeating Drumcullen by 5-12 to 1-8 and St Rynagh's by 1-14 to 2-5. Their new coach, Gerry Kirwan of Ballyskenagh, laid considerable emphasis on the age-old problems of fitness and discipline. Eugene Coughlan had come on to score the goal against Banagher; Kevin Kinahan, Kieran Dooley, James Coakley and Damien Murphy all put in great performances; and Johnny Dooley versus Martin Hanamy was one of the key tussles of the match. Their SHC campaign resumed at Kilcormac on 17 September, when the Clareen side went down to an unexpected 6-7 to 2-12 defeat, to a Coolderry side who needed the win to get into the play-offs. Not since 1952 had Seir Kieran conceded so many goals in the Championship. Eugene Coughlan would revert to full back for the remainder of the 1994 campaign, beginning at Rath the following week where a 1-10 to 0-9 victory over Kinnitty got them back on the rails.

On 2 October 1994, Seir Kieran once again faced Coolderry in the play-offs, switched to Banagher from a water-logged Lusmagh pitch. A cracking game was expected, as Seir Kieran sought revenge for the ambush at Kilcormac; but the slippery conditions made it a hard slog. Seir Kieran gradually got the upper hand, and lovely points from Mick Coughlan and Johnny Dooley brought it to Seir Kieran 0-7, Coolderry 0-6. In the Semi-final against Kilcormac/ Killoughey, the black and amber's finishing was clinical. Billy Dooley scored two goals (the second nipped off the hurley of Kilcormac goalie Stephen Byrne), and Mick Coughlan added a third, as they won by 3-13 to 0-8. The County Final of 30 October 1994 pitted Seir Kieran against Birr. In appalling weather conditions, it was the Clareen side that got off to a promising start, but Birr gradually restricted the supply of ball to the Seir Kieran danger men, while forcing the concession of frees from within Adrian Cahill's range. Seir Kieran threw everything forward in search of the winning goal, but it was Birr 0-8, Seir Kieran 0-6 at the long whistle. For want of just a little more discipline, Seir Kieran had now lost their fifth County Final out of the six contested since 1985. In wishing Birr the very best in the Leinster Club championship, however, Seir Kieran signalled that they were not finished yet:
 "The Club appreciate and thank the entire panel and team management for a big effort from early Spring through to Final day. Despite this loss spirits have been restored and the Club will be battling for honours again next year."

Offaly's third All Ireland Senior Hurling title, 1994
Éamonn Cregan's management team included fitness instructor Derry O'Donovan, whose weight training techniques would prove their worth from the very start of the year. A 3-9 to 3-7 win over Kilkenny in the Walsh Cup Semi-final on 30 January 1994 was very encouraging. Offaly easily retained their Walsh Cup Title (0-14 to 0-6) in a physically tough Final against Meath at Athboy, when Kevin Kinahan played at full back, Johnny Dooley (0-5) at wing forward, and Billy Dooley at top of the left. Joe Dooley, recovered from injury, rejoined the team in time for the make-or-break Leinster Senior Hurling Semi-final, against Kilkenny on 26 June 1994. The reigning All Ireland Champions were firm favorites not only to take the game, but to complete the three-in-a-row for the first time since 1913 (when the Graces, Walton and Dick "Drug" Walsh were in their prime). Instead, Offaly's determination, passion and will to win resulted in a 2-16 to 3-9 victory. Johnny Dooley was top scorer on six points, closely followed by Billy and Joe Dooley who finished on 1-2 apiece. Scored at the three-quarters stage, Joe's tonic of a goal capped his best performance since the late 1980s. In a last throw of the dice, the Kilkenny mentors put DJ Carey to full forward. Although Carey got little change out of Kevin Kinahan, the Cats did manage a consolatory 2-1 in the last six minutes, and got off lightly in the end.

In the Leinster Senior Hurling Final on 17 July 1994, Offaly overcame a lackluster Wexford challenge by 1-18 to 0-14, to win their eighth Leinster Title. A highlight of the game was when John Troy (as though freeze-framing the state of play) reverse-flicked over his shoulder, for Billy Dooley to let fly for the goal that killed Wexford's rally. Martin Hanamy lifted the Bob O'Keeffe Cup, and the Faithful contingent in the crowd of 32,141 went wild. En route to a victory almost as important as the breakthrough in 1980, Offaly had beaten both Wexford and Kilkenny for the first time in 96 years. During the post-match interviews, Billy Dooley remarked that the forwards were clocking up scores like 2-22 and 3-24 in challenge games. The confidence that Offaly possessed such firepower would prove crucial when the going got tough in the All Ireland Final.

In the interim, there were several heart-stopping moments in the All Ireland Senior Hurling Semi-final on 7 August, which ended Offaly 2-13, Galway 1-10. The Faithful County dominated the first half, but lost concentration and allowed a hard-hitting Galway side back into it in the third quarter. Billy Dooley's brave goal at that stage was crucial. Christy Helebert rose to a magnificent display for the Tribesmen, at the price of frees conceded in Johnny Dooley's range. Pat O'Connor, having made a comeback from his leg injuries, led the Galway defence a merry dance. Each of Offaly's rearguard was a tower of strength. Having thus avenged their Semi-final defeats of 1988 and 1990, Offaly were jubilant. However, the celebratory mood was cut short, so far as Clareen and its environs was concerned, by a tragedy off the Wexford coast that same weekend. In the next edition of the Midland Tribune, the Seir Kieran GAA Notes stated as follows:
 "It was with shock and sadness that the Club and Parish learned of the tragic death in a drowning accident while on holiday in Wexford of David Bach. To his mother, Ann, father, Geoff, and a wide circle of relatives and friends the Club extends its sincerest sympathy."

Because Offaly had finished so strongly in all of their games, they entered the All Ireland Final on 4 September 1994 wearing the unwelcome "favorites" tag. Nonetheless, it was Limerick who set the pace, and at times seemed about to overwhelm Offaly. Éamonn Cregan's philosophy of direct first-time hurling, keeping it simple, paid dividends as Offaly had more left in the tank in the dramatic finale. Offaly scored only 1-2 from frees and 2-14 from open play. Limerick's relatively poor return (2-9 from play, 0-4 from frees) was due to Brian Whelahan, Kevin Martin, Martin Hanamy, Kevin Kinahan & co. hunting in packs. Offaly's deft touches and flicks forced Limerick to go the extra mile for their scores. Moreover, having established a half time lead of 2-8 to 1-5, Tom Ryan's team only added five points in the second half. This was indicative of how Offaly gradually started to get to grips.

Even so, Limerick's explosive pace and power was such that Offaly needed all of their craft to stay alive. Mike Houlihan's opening point was answered by a goal from Joe Dooley, who pounced on Johnny Dooley's penalty rebound (in Con Houlihan's phrase) "like a hawk on a chicken too far from her mother". This early cushion proved vital, as Damien Quigley twice beat Jim Troy and was only denied a third goal when Brian Whelahan got back in time to hook. Ger Hegarty, Gary Kirby and Ciaran Carey likewise proved a handful, and Cregan chopped and changed until only Jim Troy, Kevin Kinahan and Johnny and Billy Dooley remained in their starting positions. Scores by Declan and Johnny Pilkington and Johnny and Joe Dooley brought Offaly to within two points, but Kirby, Quigley and Limerick sub Leo O'Connor put six between them again. Michael Duignan and Johnny Dooley again made inroads, only for Kirby to land a pointed free, giving Limerick some extra insurance that it seemed would not be called upon.

Then the Limerick defence, mindful perhaps of Billy Dooley's depredations in each championship game so far, floored Offaly's No. 13. As Johnny Dooley calmly stood over the ball on the 21 yard line, Derry O'Donovan signaled that a point would be the best option. However, Dooley had already made up his mind to go for goal, without taking a run at it. Suddenly it was a two-point game. Limerick goalkeeper Joe Quaid took a quick puck out, but it was Offaly's Michael Duignan who won possession and sent to Johnny Pilkington. Pilkington lobbed back in ahead of the inrushing Pat O'Connor, and the Coolderry man doubled on it to put Offaly one point ahead. Offaly's well-oiled conveyor belt of points suddenly clicked into high gear. Johnny Dooley and John Troy effortlessly found the target, and Billy Dooley sent over three in succession from the sideline by the Cusack Stand.

It may have been that the frustration of earlier losses, especially at the U-21 grade, fueled Offaly's resolve not to let it slip this time. Otherwise, there was nothing uncharacteristic about how Offaly annexed their victory. Given that Limerick were still only a point behind, even after O'Connor's goal, the real riddle was the Treatymen's failure to find a response of any kind in the last four minutes. The final score was Offaly 3-16, Limerick 2-13.

County Champions a second time – Seir Kieran in 1995
Martin Hanamy became the second St Rynagh's man (and the first from Cloghan) to lift the McCarthy Cup; Kevin Martin won Tullamore's first All Ireland Senior hurling medal; while the Birr, Lusmagh, St Rynagh's and Coolderry contingents each received heroes' welcomes in their home place. Even so, the Clareen homecoming, on Friday, 9 September 1994, was something special. Éamonn Cregan greatly valued Tony Murphy's role as Offaly hurling secretary. Kevin Kinahan had held scoreless Limerick's full forward Pat Heffernan. Joe, Billy and Johnny Dooley had amassed a combined 2-11. Joe and Johnny Dooley became the first pair of brothers in modern times to each score a goal in an All Ireland Senior Hurling Final (a feat matched only by the Powers of Carrickshock in the Final of 2014). Three of Offaly's six All Star Awards in 1994 came to Seir Kieran – to Johnny and Billy Dooley and to Kevin Kinahan. The club's priority for 1995 was to use these achievements as a springboard back to the top in the Offaly SHC.

Seir Kieran's selectors for 1995 were Gerry Kirwan (coach), Christy Coughlan, Johnny Breslin, Willie Dooley and Tommy Hynes. In the opening round of the Senior Hurling Championship, the team unexpectedly went down to a more determined and hungry Coolderry by 0-11 to 0-10. A dour and workmanlike victory over Kinnitty in the second round (1-10 to 0-8) steadied the ship. Victory came at a price, as Billy Dooley was carried off with an ankle injury. It was a seriously depleted Clareen panel who lined out against Tullamore on 27 May 1995, and stared elimination in the face throughout the game. With Tullamore ahead by 1-5 to 0-2, their goalie tossed up the ball to clear it – whereupon Eugene Coughlan flicked it to the net. Reduced to 14 men in the second half, Seir Kieran were again in dire trouble, but regrouped doggedly. Mick Mulrooney's goal and points from James Coakley and Johnny Dooley preceded Dooley's great equalizer from a '65. Kevin Abbott scored the winning point (Seir Kieran 2-13, Tullamore 2-12). It was a Lazarus act unprecedented in the club's long history, and meant it was still all to play for when the championship resumed after the inter-county hiatus.

By beating Kilcormac/ Killoughey by 2-16 to 2-7 on 24 September, Seir Kieran put themselves emphatically in the frame for a place in the last four. This was secured by a 2-21 to 0-1 mismatch against Belmont on 7 October. Seir Kieran's Semi-final assignment was Birr, who had gone on to win their first All Ireland Club Title against Dunloy (following a replay). Yet the wear-and-tear that this had cost them, coupled with Seir Kieran's absolute cohesion, meant that the Clareen attitude was one of "now or never". It did not look that way at first. Simon and Brian Whelahan, Ray Landy, Declan Pilkington and Oisin O'Neill had all scored by the time Johnny Dooley opened Seir Kieran's account. Birr recommenced scoring almost at will; until Eugene Coughlan burst through for a great goal that showed weakness in the Birr defence. Mick Mulrooney capitalized by grabbing two more goals, for a slender interval lead (3-2 to 0-9). Jimmy Connor replaced Eugene Coughlan for the second half, when Johnny Dooley scored all six Seir Kieran points. Scores from Ray Landy and Conor McGlone kept the townsmen in the hunt, as both managements made wholesale changes. Brian Whelahan went to full forward for Birr, while Clareen captain Joe Dooley dropped back to help lift the siege. Eventually Whelahan got in for a stunning goal, but Birr were still one point behind (3-8 to 1-13) and on the attack when the referee blew it up.

With only one week to get set, the Senior Hurling Final against St Rynagh's (22 October 1995 at St Brendan's Park) looked like an even trickier proposition. In the event, two wholly committed sides played out an exciting 1-13 to 1-13 draw, in front of a record attendance of over six thousand. St Rynagh's were very slight favorites going into the replay, on the basis that the Shannonsiders had always taken their second chances before. Instead, Seir Kieran prevailed by 0-10 to 0-9. The line-out for the replay (Saturday 28 October) was Liam Coughlan (goalie), Paddy Mulrooney, Kevin Kinahan, Paddy Connors, Damien Murphy, Ger Connors, Paul Scully, Noel Bergin, Joe Dooley (captain), Johnny Dooley, Mick Coughlan, James Coakley, Billy Dooley, Eugene Coughlan, and Mick Mulrooney. The three subs called upon on the day were Jimmy Connor, Finbarr O'Neill and Kieran Dooley. As the new Offaly champions, Seir Kieran had a Leinster Club Championship fixture in Carlow the very next day, where they beat Naomh Eoin by 3-10 to 0-7. Six days after that (Saturday 11 November), in Dr. Cullen Park, Kilkenny champions Glenmore brought Seir Kieran's campaign to a full stop (1-14 to 0-12). Back in Kinnitty on 26 November 1995, victory in the long-delayed 1994 Senior Hurling League Final(Seir Kieran 2-15, Drumcullen 2-6) restored morale, as did the 1995 All Star Awards won by Kevin Kinahan, Johnny Dooley and Billy Dooley. However, winning out the Offaly SHC was the one that mattered, and was Seir Kieran's most important win since 1988. Eugene Coughlan summed it up:
 "I have never seen players, committee members and everyone involved with the club dig so deep."

Back-to-back titles and attempted three-in-a-row – Seir Kieran 1996-97
At the Offaly GAA Convention for 1996, Seir Kieran won the accolade of "Club of the Year" for the second time. In accepting the Fr. McWey Cup, Michael Murphy the club chairman stressed that Seir Kieran were just as proud of their part in the success of Offaly hurling. The Offaly Senior Hurling Championship of 1996 was defined, so far as Seir Kieran were concerned, by lop-sided victories over Belmont and Ballyskenagh and by four no-holds-barred matches against Kilcormac/ Killoughey. These comprised: an exciting second-round match that finished Seir Kieran 1-10, Kilcormac/ Killoughey 0-13; an unexpectedly easy passage in the play-offs (Seir Kieran 1-11, Kilcormac/ Killoughey 1-3); another draw (3-12-all) in the Semi-final on 22 September 1996; and a definitive 0-14 to 0-7 win in the replay six days later. 
With the Double-K's shaken off at last, Seir Kieran contemplated the prospect of a historic Double of their own – assuming they had enough left in the tank to handle St Rynagh's in the Final. The punditry reckoned St Rynagh's would do it this time, having kept the Birr danger-men under wraps in the other bruising Semi-final. However, several of the Banagher camp, such as selector Alo Horan, were much more cautious than that:
 "Seir Kieran were victorious last year because they wanted it more than we did. While some of their lads might not be all that skillful, they all have great spirit and would die for their parish. Certainly they will go out and give it everything on the day."

Despite the cross-field gale and the cascading showers on County Final day itself (13 October 1996), Seir Kieran did indeed give it everything, defeating St Rynagh's by 0-13 to 1-8 to put Senior Hurling Titles back-to-back. The black and amber deployed as follows: Liam Coughlan (goalie), Paul Scully, Kevin Kinahan, Paddy Connors, Damien Murphy, Ger Connors, Kieran Dooley, Joe Dooley, Noel Bergin, Johnny Dooley, Mick Coughlan, Mick Mulrooney, Billy Dooley, Eugene Coughlan, Seamus Dooley, and substitutes Kieran Kealey and Jimmy Connor. It was their eighth appearance in the decider in 12 years, of which they had now won three. County Board chairman Brendan Ward presented the Sean Robbins Cup to a delighted Liam Coughlan. On 24 November, Coughlan would also collect the Pat Carroll Cup, after Seir Kieran defeated Kilcormac/ Killoughey in the 1996 SHL Final by 1-12 to 0-6. In the interim, Seir Kieran's third-ever Leinster Club Hurling Championship campaign once again foundered at the Leinster Semi-final stage. Following a spell-binding 1-24 to 0-4 win over Trim in the opening round at Athboy, the Clareen panel went to Portlaoise on 10 November to face O'Toole's. The Dublin champions (including former Kilkenny forwards Eamonn Morrissey and Jamesie "Shiner" Brennan) powered into a 1-10 to 0-2 lead after the first quarter. Out-maneuvered nearly everywhere, Seir Kieran drew on vast reserves of character and resolve, and lived to fight another day (Seir Kieran 3-10, O'Toole's 1-16). Back in Portlaoise the following Saturday, the Offaly champions were again stretched thin, and again held their shape and composure to make inroads in the second half. O'Toole's kept topping up their points total, however, and (despite Joe Dooley nipping in for a late goal) advanced by 0-18 to 2-9.

Undeterred by their failure to navigate further in Leinster, Seir Kieran advanced to the 1997 Senior Hurling Final undefeated, with wins over Lusmagh (1-11 to 0-5), Kilcormac/ Killoughey (0-15 to 1-9), Belmont (5-17 to 0-4), and Tullamore in the Semi-final (2-15 to 2-10). In the Final itself, played out against Birr on 5 October 1997, Joe Dooley was hampered by a leg injury as he alternated between midfield and full forward. This made it easier for Birr to keep tabs on the other Clareen playmakers, and to win out by four points (0-14 to 2-4). In the midst of bitter disappointment in the black and amber camp, what did not change was the determination to challenge, the following year, as ferociously as ever. In the meantime, a great victory in the Junior Hurling 'B' Championship ensured that the year ended on a high. At Rath on 2 November 1997, the following team beat Coolderry in the Final by 2-9 to 2-4: Damien Coffey (goalie), Tom Connor, Paddy Mulrooney, John Coakley, Kevin Dooley, Joe Guinan, Finbarr Murphy, Pat Mulrooney, Aidan O'Neill, Kieran Troy, Noel Bergin, Kevin Abbott, Joe Mooney, Sean Coughlan, and TJ Dooley.

Triumph, then disappointment – Offaly Hurling 1995 to 1997
Having turned the tide in the 1994 All Ireland Final, Offaly looked set to blossom into the dominant team of the mid-1990s. At the same moment, however, Limerick, Clare and Wexford were surging to the top ranks of hurling counties, while Kilkenny and other "traditional" powers remained a threat. In response, Offaly upped their own performance levels even further; but their lack of options on the bench began to tell against them. The Birr contingent won their first All Ireland Club Title in March 1995, so they were unavailable to Éamonn Cregan for most of the NHL campaign (during which Johnny Dooley amassed 1-58). The Faithful County still managed to regain Division 1 status and had pleasing wins over Liam Griffin's Wexford (0-16 to 0-14) and over Cork in the Quarter-final (3-10 to 2-11). Although Kilkenny beat them by 4-8 to 0-14 in the League Semi-final at Thurles, Cregan shrugged off Offaly's slackness as something that could be fixed in time for championship. The coach's sangfroid was vindicated by Offaly's 2-14 to 1-10 victory over Wexford on 25 June – the first Leinster Senior Hurling Championship match to be broadcast live on television. Joe Dooley's goal was vital in maintaining an advantage in the third quarter, when Wexford's strategy of luring Offaly's half back line out of position looked like it might pay off. Unbeaten by the Slaneysiders since 1979, Offaly had nearly come to depend on Wexford's erratic shooting whenever the chips were down. That remained true in 1995 – but Griffin would have recalibrated by the following year.

Billy Dooley (0-5) was Offaly's top scorer in the Leinster Senior Hurling Final on 16 July 1995. The throw-in was delayed by a cloudburst, accompanied by thunder and lightning, during which Offaly retreated to their dressing room while the Kilkenny players huddled miserably in the dug-outs. When play did commence, Offaly answered those who had installed Kilkenny as favorites by recording one of their most total victories (Offaly 2-16, Kilkenny 2-5). Although only 0-5 to 0-3 up by half time, the Faithful County had absorbed phenomenal pressure and had broken Kilkenny's resolve by then. Offaly's deft flicks and passes opened up the game in the second half, and the scores began to flow. With Kevin Kinahan in close attendance, DJ Carey made no headway until too late to matter. Since 1980, Offaly had now lifted the Bob O'Keeffe Cup nine times (to seven for the Cats). In the All Ireland Semi-final (6 August 1995), Offaly beat Down by 2-19 to 2-8. On a sweltering afternoon that sapped the energy of some players, Johnny Dooley's 11-point contribution ensured that there would be no repeat of the Antrim result in 1989. Ger Loughnane's Clare team would be the opposition on 3 September, in the 1995 All Ireland Final. On all known form, the reigning All Ireland Champions were the better bet to prevail on this occasion – provided they could rise to the same level of intensity as they had shown in the Leinster Final.

In the event, the Faithful County went down by two points (Clare 1-13, Offaly 2-8). While they had known that everything bar the kitchen sink would be thrown at them, Offaly were unbraced for the sheer wall of noise that greeted the Bannermens' entry into the arena. Éamonn Cregan would afterwards reflect that, while Clare were not any fitter than Offaly, their grueling training sessions had conferred an advantage in terms of upper body strength. Ger Loughnane's astute switches were a factor also, and Offaly only scored 1-2 after the interval. Even so, Kevin Kinahan defiantly retained control at full back, and the team's greater skill and craft kept them in the hunt. Johnny Pilkington's goal edged them two points in front with four minutes to go, at which stage a couple of wides let Clare off the hook. Clare substitute Eamonn Taaffe nabbed what proved the decisive goal when Antony Daly's effort came back off the post. Referee Dickie Murphy blew it up after virtually no injury time. Having lifted the McCarthy Cup, Daly said in his acceptance speech that Offaly's rise had been an inspiration to teams like Clare. This was scant consolation to the runners-up, who had left everything on the pitch in the quest to put All Ireland Titles back-to-back.

Offaly won promotion from Division 2 of the National Hurling League the following Spring, notwithstanding a hideous 1-28 to 1-1 NHL defeat to Galway on 18 February 1996, and an ominous 1-14 to 2-3 League Quarter-final exit at the hands of Wexford. When the championship commenced on 2 June 1996, Offaly also had trouble in putting Meath away (2-18 to 2-12). Liam Coughlan (goalie), Kevin Kinahan (full back), Johnny Dooley (left half forward), Joe Dooley (right half forward) and Billy Dooley (top of the left) lined out together – the first time that Seir Kieran had had five representatives in the Leinster Senior Hurling Championship. Each of them went on to play in the Semi-final victory over Laois (Offaly 4-17, Laois 2-10), and in the Leinster Final defeat to Wexford on 14 July 1996 (Wexford 2-23, Offaly 2-15).

John McIntyre, the sports editor for the Connaught Tribune, would be appointed Offaly coach for the 1997 League and Championship, with selectors Willie Dooley (Seir Kieran), Jim Troy (Lusmagh), and Sean White (St Rynagh's). Joe Dooley was Offaly's captain for 1997, when the panel was freshened up by the likes of Gary Hanniffy and Gary Cahill (Birr), Ger Oakley (Carrig & Riverstown), Cillian Farrell (Edenderry), Paudie Mulhare (St Rynagh's) and Colm Cassidy (Kilcormac/ Killoughey). However, the playmakers still comprised the "Old Guard" for the most part. In the first round of the Leinster Championship in Mullingar, Offaly saw off Meath much more handily than they had in 1996 (3-20 to 0-8), but were very nearly caught out by Laois in the next round (Offaly 1-11, Laois 2-7). It was back to Croke Park on 22 June 1997, when Offaly took on the All Ireland Champions in the Leinster Senior Hurling Semi-final. As in 1996, Offaly and Wexford served up an enthralling game; and Offaly came off second-best in the end. Wexford raised two green flags early on, but Billy Dooley's goal just before the short whistle gave his team a fighting chance. However, it was the fourth quarter before Offaly meshed into their top gear. It was too late on this occasion, as Wexford advanced with a goal to spare (Wexford 3-12, Offaly 2-12).

This was only the fourth time in eighteen years that Offaly had failed to qualify for the Leinster Senior Hurling Final. In 1991, 1992 and 1993, Offaly had had recent success at Minor and U-21 level. There was no such silver lining in 1997. On the other hand, Offaly's status as a hurling county was higher than ever before. At the August 1996 meeting of the Offaly County Board, Brendan Ward the chairman and Tony Murphy the hurling secretary recalled that during their four years in charge, Éamonn Cregan, Derry O'Donovan and their selectors had delivered two Leinster Titles, victory and runners-up in two All Ireland Championships, two Walsh Cups and one Oireachtas Title. Mr. Ward added:
 "That was tremendous progress. I pay tribute to those men, they did a powerful job for Offaly."

Offaly and Seir Kieran – Champions in 1998, runners-up in 2000

Offaly's eight championship games of 1998
As John McIntyre's term in charge of the Offaly Senior hurlers was not renewed, he was replaced by the former Tipperary and Laois manager, Michael 'Babs' Keating. At club level, Seir Kieran also had a new coach, Michael Connolly of Kinnitty (who had previously coached the Clareen U-16's to a county title in 1983). This was just one more sign of how tightly the fortunes of Seir Kieran and Offaly had converged. Club and county would both win a long-odds Senior Championship in 1998, be knocked off their perch in 1999, and claw back into the Final in 2000.

In the National Hurling League in the Spring of 1998, Offaly avoided a relegation play-off against Kilkenny only by virtue of a better scoring record than had Antrim. Mitigating factors were Johnny Dooley's knee trouble, and the absence of the Birr contingent (which again lifted the Tommy Moore Cup on St Patrick's Day). Although the injury situation had reached crisis proportions by the first round of the championship, Offaly beat Meath with 32 points to spare (4-28 to 0-8). This was a good tee-up for the crucial Leinster Semi-final. At Croke Park on 14 June 1998, a heart-stopping game of swaying fortunes again looked to be shaded Wexford's way. However, the Slaneysiders would come to rue their nine first-half wides, as Offaly's vastly-improved teamwork in the second half brought them within range. Paul Codd's ninth point put Wexford two clear, leaving Offaly no option but to go for broke. On 69 minutes, Johnny Dooley's strike found its way through a crowded goalmouth to the net, and Wexford were eliminated by 1-15 to 0-17.

Notwithstanding Offaly's fortuitous victory, dissent was still brewing over Babs Keating's coaching regimen. This consisted mainly of Johnny Murray's physical training drills, rather than hurling practice (although the physical fitness undoubtedly stood to Offaly later on in the year). On 5 July 1998, Offaly's 15th Leinster Senior Hurling Final appearance since 1980 resulted in a poor performance against Kilkenny, and a 3-10 to 1-11 defeat. The Cats were not at their sharpest either, but got over the finish line with two converted frees by DJ Carey (who had retired from inter-county hurling and then changed his mind). As the "back door" system now gave a second chance to beaten provincial finalists, Offaly were still alive. However, Babs Keating's post-match comments to the press, in which he disparaged his side's commitment, incensed several of the panel. Johnny Pilkington became their spokesman by giving a press interview of his own the following day. It became clear that Keating lacked sufficient support, either among the players or at the County Board, to stay in the saddle. He was replaced by Michael Bond of Galway, who had coached the Galway U-21 hurlers to an All Ireland in 1983.

Offaly's first "back door" match was the All Ireland Senior Hurling Quarter-final against Antrim. Due to the sectarian violence that racked Northern Ireland that July, very few Antrim supporters came to Croke Park for this game. Offaly won by 2-18 to 2-9, and advanced to the All Ireland Semi-final with everything to prove. The defending champions, Clare, were also on a mission, as the disciplinary action taken against Colin Lynch (after the Munster Final against Waterford) left them feeling hard done by. The result was a contest of gladiatorial intensity, that finished Offaly 1-13, Clare 1-13. Back at Croke Park on Saturday 22 August, Offaly lined out wearing black armbands in memory of Paudie Mulhare's father, who had died that morning. (Ger Oakley started at midfield in place of Mulhare.) The Bannermen gave a more assured display than the previous week, and were ten points ahead at one stage. Offaly's drastic switches of personnel helped them to find their rhythm, and to rattle Clare in the closing stages. They were still three points behind when referee Jimmy Cooney blew it up – after only 32 minutes and 54 seconds, or five minutes sooner than the referee had intended. He tried restarting, but several players were leaving the pitch and too many supporters were milling around. (In the subsequent weeks, abusive, cowardly and anonymous phone calls would be made to the referee's family home.)

The upshot was a sit-in on the pitch by up to 3,000 Offaly supporters, so the Kerry v Kildare U-21 'B' hurling final had to be abandoned. This demonstration upped the ante on the Games Administration Committee, and deepened the bonds between the Offaly panel and its fan base. On the other hand, – and notwithstanding the provisions of Rule 137 of the Official Guide – the decisive factor was Clare's sportsmanship in not disputing the decision to stage the contest a third time. This would cost them dearly at Semple Stadium the following Saturday, when it was Offaly who prevailed by 0-16 to 0-13. IR£200,000 of the proceeds of this game went to help those hurt or bereaved by the Omagh Bombing. Joe Dooley was both top scorer and Man of the Match; Ger "Sparrow" O'Loughlin was replaced having got no change out of Kevin Kinahan; while the goalie Stephen Byrne (Kilcormmac/ Killoughey) pulled off three superb saves. This was a team performance and there were no weak links. Michael Bond's charges continued this run of form into the All Ireland Final itself, on 13 September 1998. Once more facing a physically-tough Kilkenny side, Offaly overturned the Leinster Final verdict and won by 2-16 to 1-13. Of a myriad highlights, few would be more talked about than Brian Whelahan's move upfield, to become the fulcrum of the Offaly attack. Before lifting the McCarthy Cup, Offaly captain Hubert Rigney (St Rynagh's) declared: "We may have gone in the back door – but we're coming out the front!" The next issue of the Midland Tribune attempted to sum up, from the Faithful County's point of view, a roller-coaster year:
 "So who are the heroes? Eighteen on the pitch on Sunday, ten more in the dugout, three in charge, and the team secretary from old Clareen in the background. Brendan Ward too deserves immense credit, along with Christy Todd, and all who contributed to what was the most controversial and the most amazing hurling year of all time."

Seir Kieran's eleven championship games of 1998
The Liam MacCarthy Cup stopped off in Clareen on Wednesday, 16 September 1998, another magical night for both club and parish. The All Star Awards won by Joe Dooley and Kevin Kinahan in December were the icing on the cake. Even so, Seir Kieran's main focus remained the Offaly SHC. Apart from Michael Connolly the coach, the selectors for 1998 were Sean Coughlan, Sean Bergin and Willie Dooley. Their first assignment on 25 April was the recently crowned All Ireland Club champions. Conditions were heavy – one of Liam Coughlan's puck-outs plugged without a bounce into the muck – but both sides hurled well. As usual, though, Birr's switches stifled Seir Kieran's early advantage, and they gradually pulled away (Birr 3-14, Seir Kieran 2-7). Another defeat in the second round (Coolderry 1-7, Seir Kieran 0-6) used up more of Seir Kieran's nine lives. On the bright side, they could hope to have Johnny Dooley recovered from injury by the time the domestic championship resumed.

Seir Kieran clambered back into contention in the Autumn by four wins in four weeks, beating Drumcullen by 3-10 to 1-8, Lusmagh by 3-9 to 1-10, Tullamore by 2-14 to 2-8, then Kilcormac/ Killoughey by 3-16 to 1-10 in the Quarter-final. Joe Dooley inspired many of their best passages of play. It was the same story against Coolderry on 25 October, when the black and amber avenged their May defeat (3-10 to 1-10) and stormed into their tenth Offaly Senior Hurling Final since 1985. In a tense and scrappy decider on 10 November 1998, St Rynagh's scored 1-6 from play (to only 0-1 from play for the Clareen men). However, Johnny Dooley converted from each of the ten frees (including a last-minute '65) awarded within scoring range, and the sides finished deadlocked (Seir Kieran 0-11, St Rynagh's 1-8). Thirteen days later, the two clubs renewed their epic rivalry. Seir Kieran prevailed by 1-11 to 0-8.

Amidst jubilant scenes in St Brendan's Park, Kevin Kinahan lifted the Sean Robbins Cup, the last act of a quite extraordinary Offaly Senior Hurling Championship. The following day (Sunday 22 November) the team traveled to Arklow and beat Kiltegan by 2-12 to 0-9. As was the case in 1988, 1995 and 1996, the Leinster Club Semi-final at Nowlan Park proved a bridge too far. On 29 November, Rathnure beat the Offaly standard-bearers by 3-11 to 2-8. Nonetheless, the year 1998 stands among Seir Kieran's finest, as was well expressed in a message from Carrig & Riverstown, another rural club:
 "Well done to Seir Kieran on winning the County Final in Birr last Saturday. Apart from being unlucky in last year's Final they have now won four Championships. They give great hope for the survival and the future of small clubs."

Losing the crown – Seir Kieran and Offaly in 1999
 In April 1999, Seir Kieran reached another Offaly Junior Hurling League decider. Although they lost to Lusmagh in the Final (4-7 to 3-6), their battling display augured well for the fast-approaching championships. Seir Kieran's defence of their Senior Title opened on the first of May, with a 3-7 to 0-11 win over Drumcullen – although "the Sash" stayed in the lead until late on. Seir Kieran also looked vulnerable against Kilcormac/ Killoughey in the second round. With Johnny Dooley again out, the black and amber had 14 wides and lost by 1-14 to 3-6. When the Offaly SHC resumed in August, Sseir Kieran proved themselves back on song with a 1-16 to 0-10 win over Coolderry. Rath was the venue for the fourth round match against St Rynagh's, in which Johnny Dooley scored ten points to match his exploits in the drawn Final of 1998. Paudie Mulhare equalized for the Banagher side (0-15 apiece). In the last group game, Seir Kieran succumbed to an ominous 3-17 to 1-12 defeat by Birr. Although a hard-fought, touch-and-go victory (1-13 to 2-9) over Lusmagh in the Quarter-final steadied the Clareen ship, they still had come up with no answers for Birr by the time of the Semi-final. The defending champions were eliminated on the score-line Birr 3-22, Seir Kieran 1-7. It was the first time in six years that the black and amber had failed to contest the Offaly Senior Hurling Final. On the other hand, they reached the Offaly Junior 'A' Hurling Final on 25 September 1999 – the first time Seir Kieran had done so in 30 years. They narrowly lost the Final to Kilcormac/ Killoughey (1-12 to 2-6). Meanwhile, John Coughlan the club's president and his wife Mary received a Sean Gael award at a function in Tullamore.

When the 1999 inter-county championships got going, Seir Kieran again had four representatives on Michael Bond's panel. In addition, Damien Murphy, James Coakley and Joe Guinan were called up to the Offaly Intermediate panel, coached by Paddy Scales (St Rynagh's) with selectors Seamus Coakley (Seir Kieran) and Joe Cleary (Shinrone). The Intermediates were beaten by Kilkenny in June. In the Leinster Senior Hurling Semi-final on 20 June 1999, Offaly saw off Wexford by 3-17 to 0-15. Joe, Billy and Johnny Dooley pitched in for a combined 1-13, and Kevin Kinahan also played a stormer. In the Leinster Final on 11 July, however, the reigning Leinster Champions, now coached by Brian Cody felled the reigning All Ireland Champions (Kilkenny 5-14, Offaly 1-16).  Kilkenny's goals were scored by DJ Carey (2), Henry Shefflin, Charlie Carter and Brian McEvoy. With their pride severely stung, the Faithful County regrouped admirably. Antrim hit them with everything in the All Ireland Quarter-Final, but Offaly still won by 4-22 to 0-12. The All Ireland Semi-final on 8 August 1999 was only the second-ever meeting between Cork and Offaly in the Senior Hurling Championship, and Joe Dooley was the only player to span the fifteen years since the Centenary Final. Notwithstanding the wet and greasy conditions, the game became an instant classic of wet-day hurling, and the caliber of both sides' display was absolutely top-drawer. The Rebels shaded it by 0-19 to 0-16. Cork and Offaly each scored 0-12 from play, so the match turned on the frees awarded by the referee, Dickie Murphy. Another crucial factor was the maturity shown by Jimmy Barry-Murphy's gifted young team when Offaly's grip seemed to be tightening. In the aftermath, Johnny Pilkington expressed his side's perplexity at having played so brilliantly, and yet having lost the game:
 "I don't know where it went wrong – if it did go wrong."

The championships of 2000
Pat Fleury took over from Michael Bond for the 2000 season, for which Johnny Dooley was team captain. Although both Billy Dooley and Martin Hanamy had retired, Offaly again defeated Wexford (3-15 to 0-8) in the opening round of the championship. When both the Offaly Minor and U-21 hurling teams won out their Leinster Finals, it briefly seemed that the Faithful County's underage prospects were reviving. In the Leinster Senior Hurling Final, however, Kilkenny beat Offaly comprehensively (Kilkenny 2-21, Offaly 1-13). Kevin Kinahan grimly summed up this third-in-a-row Leinster Final defeat: "They opened us up and spread us out – typical Kilkenny." The All Ireland Quarter-final took place on 23 July 2000, between Offaly and Derry.

 Not only had Derry shocked Antrim in the Ulster decider, but in the second half of this Quarter-final, Offaly's experimental side looked to be in real difficulty. With an outstanding 12 points from Johnny Dooley, the Faithful County pulled through (Offaly 2-23, Derry 2-17). Not many people rated their chances for the All-Ireland Semi-final re-match against Cork. On the day, however, Offaly wore down their opponents with a display of passion, power and pride, before storming to a famous 0-19 to 0-15 victory. Gary Hanniffy (Birr) got the better of Brian Corcoran, while Kevin Kinahan effortlessly intercepted the balls lofted in towards Joe Deane in the second half. Joe Dooley rated this: "one of the sweetest victories of my career.".

Although Pat Fleury's team were still the underdogs going into the All Ireland Final (10 September 2000), they believed that losing both the 1998 and the 1999 Finals would pile the pressure on Kilkenny in the closing stages. For this to be a factor, Offaly would have to prevent the concession of goals early on. That was exactly what they failed to do, as the rampant Cats scored two early goals. Johnny Dooley led by example and never gave up, but each time Offaly looked like making a comeback, Kilkenny bagged another goal. It finished Kilkenny 5-15, Offaly 1-14. Just like in 1984 and 1995, the supporters turned out for the team's homecoming in their droves. Johnny Dooley said: "I think this is not the end of Offaly hurling". The Offaly captain would receive his third All Star Award in December 2000.

As usual, the end of Offaly's All Ireland campaign signaled the resumption of the domestic Senior Hurling Championship, in which Seir Kieran had finished level in the first round in April (Seir Kieran 1-11, Kilcormac/ Killoughey 1-11) then again against St Rynagh's in May (Seir Kieran 1-12, St Rynagh's 0-15). On 16 September 2000, yet a third draw (1-13 to 0-16) was the result against Birr, when a last-gasp free by Brian Whelahan – the only still-playing athlete to be selected on the GAA's Team of the Millennium – tied it up for the town. Seir Kieran's first outright win of that year's SHC finally came on 24 September against Lusmagh, when a rain of points from all angles made it Seir Kieran 1-19, Lusmagh 2-8. Next up was Ballyskenagh, whom the black and amber defeated (Seir Kieran 4-10, Ballyskenagh 1-9) to earn direct passage to the last four. Against Kilcormac/ Killoughey on 3 December 2000, Seir Kieran narrowly prevailed (0-11 to 0-10), despite the match being marred by an injury to Joe Dooley. That winter was one of the wettest since records began, and was followed in early Spring 2001 by the Foot and Mouth crisis. Therefore, the 2000 Offaly Senior Hurling Final did not proceed until 25 March 2001. It ended Birr 3-21, Seir Kieran 1-9 – the biggest Clareen defeat in the County Final since 1952.

Modern times

Maintaining senior status
Seir Kieran regrouped after the setback in the County Final, lifting the Pat Carroll Cup on 8 July 2001 following a replay (Seir Kieran 1-14, Coolderry 2-10). The team fielded as follows: Liam Coughlan; Kieran Dooley, Paddy Connors (captain), Kevin Abbott; Damien Murphy, Kevin Kinahan, Raymond Dooley; Johnny Dooley, Joe Guinan; Finbarr O'Neill, Mick Coughlan, Joe Dooley; Billy Dooley, Seamus Dooley, Barry Bergin; and substitutes Eugene Coughlan and Damien Coffey. They reached the Quarter-final of the 2001 SHC against the same opposition. Although this exciting tussle also went to a replay, Coolderry won out by 3-13 to 3-9. The club failed to mount a serious challenge for the Sean Robbins Cup in the next few years. Many of their long-serving players retired from Senior hurling, and a string of championship losses in 2007 put Seir Kieran's Senior status in jeopardy. A similar situation pertained in 2008, when a nightmare defeat to Kinnitty in the opening round of the championship left them in relegation trouble later on, but they survived the relegation play-offs against Shamrocks and Drumcullen.

By 2009, the Seir Kieran panel was being augmented by some of the talented players who had won out the 2008 U-21 Title. However, Liam Coughlan continued his long service as goalkeeper, while other vastly experienced players also played on. They reached the Senior Hurling Quarter-final against Kilcormac/ Killoughey. With young Joe Bergin in devastating form at centre-forward, the black and amber had the winning of this match, but it went to a replay on 27 September which then went to extra time. It finished Kilcormac/ Killoughey 2-19, Seir Kieran 3-12. The team was coached by Padraig Madden, with selectors Seamus Dooley and Mick Coughlan. The Double Ks also eliminated Seir Kieran (1-14 to 1-11) in the Senior Hurling Quarter-final of 19 September 2010. 

Seir Kieran won out the Senior Hurling League on 22 March 2011, when Donal Coughlan became the first Clareen man in a decade to lift the Pat Carroll Cup. Michael Ryan (Tynagh) was coach, with selectors Willie Dooley and Jimmy Connor. However, Coolderry were too strong for them in the 2011 SHC Quarter-final; and it was the same story against Shinrone who advanced to the last four in 2012 (Shinrone 0-16, Seir Kieran 0-11). A breakthrough of sorts was achieved in 2013, when Seir Kieran beat Coolderry to reach their first Senior Semi-final since the turn of the century, where they lost to Kilcormac/ Killoughey. With James Mulrooney in excellent form, they also got to the last four in 2014. However, it was St Rynagh's who went on to the County Final (St Rynagh's 1-17, Seir Kieran 2-07).

Building a new clubhouse and compiling the club's history
The Seir Kieran clubhouse was redeveloped in the early years of the 21st century, a project managed by the then Club Secretary, Willie Dooley. As well as expanded changing and shower facilities for hurling, camogie and other Gaelic games, the redevelopment comprises enhanced meeting areas used by the GAA and other organisations in the local community. On completion of the project in early 2006, the entire debt from the cost of construction had been discharged.

In the same time frame, the club's history, The Music of the Ash, was published. The Secretary asked Jimmy Blake, a club member with a degree in history from University College Dublin, to write the book, which was then edited by Professor Muiris O'Sullivan of the UCD School of Archaeology. The book runs to almost 500 pages and narrates most of the matches in which Seir Kieran players have lined out. It lists the scoreline, team and opposing team for about 1,050 games between 1887 and 2001, including for 283 Offaly Senior league and championship games, 99 Leinster and All Ireland Senior Hurling Championship games, and 193 National Hurling League ties. Also included are 58 photographs and illustrations, 34 of which are in colour. Nickey Brennan, the GAA president, termed the book "a massive undertaking".

The official opening of the new clubhouse, together with the launch of the Club History, took place in April 2006. The then Minister for Finance (and future Taoiseach), Brian Cowen, T.D., commended the contribution to Offaly that Seir Kieran continued to make, and declared the facility open. Other speakers included Ollie Daly, the then chairman of the Offaly County Board, GAA, Michael Murphy, the then Seir Kieran chairman, Willie Dooley, and Muiris O'Sullivan. Sean Dooley acted as M.C. for the evening. In the course of his remarks, Professor O'Sullivan said that the heroes of this book were not only there in the clubhouse. He said there was a belief in Ireland long ago that the souls of the dead gathered round close to the living at special times of the year. The heroes of this book were abroad, either living or dead, down in the graveyard or around the country.

Competitions involving the Seir Kieran National School
Training in the skills of the Gaelic games has become a more central part of PE courses at Seir Kieran National School in recent years, and has aimed at maximising the athletic potential and team-working of every girl and boy. The U-13 School team and the U-13 ground hurling team both won out their competitions in 2007. They were presented with their medals by Joseph Bergin on Saturday, 1 March 2008. Also present on the night were the club's main sponsors that year, Osierbrook Cottages, Ciara Morris and Michael Camon, as well as Fr. Peter Muldowney, PP.

In September 2009, the Seir Kieran U-12 camogie team won their Title, beating Kinnitty in a thrilling match. In 2014, the School's hurlers won out the 'B' Title and reached the Final of the 'A' championship. In October 2014, the Seir Kieran GAA club presented a hurley to each pupil, in recognition for their successful efforts on the field of play in the previous school year. Eugene Coughlan, who had won Seir Kieran's first All Star Award 30 years previously, made the presentation to each boy and girl.

The Under 21 hurling title of 2008
On a score line of Seir Kieran 0-8, Shamrocks 1-4, Seir Kieran won the Under 16 ‘B’ hurling title in November 2007. In dreadful weather conditions at Mount Bolus, Thomas Carroll did well to score five points from play. However, it took a late pointed free from Sean Coughlan to give the Clareen side victory over a courageous Shamrocks panel. Seir Kieran were the better team over the hour, although they squandered wind advantage by shooting ten first-half wides. Conor Kennedy the captain lifted the Peter Fox Memorial Cup.

This Title was a prelude to an even more notable win the following springtime, when Seir Kieran Óg beat Kilcormac Killoughey Gaels (1-11 to 0-13) in the Offaly U-21 'A' Hurling Final. Having scored 1-6 of the winners' total, Joseph Bergin the captain lifted the P.J. Teehan Cup. The winning panel were drawn entirely from the Parish of Seir Kieran, an achievement which was widely commented on and admired. Seir Kieran Óg also reached the U-21 'A' Final at Banagher in 2009, although Kilcormac/ Killoughey proved too strong on this occasion. The Clareen side only had one substitute on the bench. In 2010, when the panel was augmented by players from Drumcullen and Gracefield, Seir Kieran Óg reached their third U-21 Final in succession, but lost to Coolderry.

The Junior 'A' hurling titles of 2006 and 2014
Seir Kieran bridged a 37-year gap by winning out the Junior 'A' Final of 2006. Kevin Carey the captain lifted the James Clarke Cup. Joe Dooley, by now reverted to Junior hurling, played a starring role. Winning this Title was a signal accomplishment, as each of the club's previous five Junior championships were in years when the club had no Senior team. The black and amber would continue on winning ways at Lusmagh on 29 November 2008, by winning the Division 3 Hurling League Final (Seir Kieran 1-10, Drumcullen 1-9). Five of the side had played in the 1988 Offaly Senior Hurling Final, all of twenty years before. By contrast, six others had lined out in the 2008 Minor Semi-final against St Rynagh's on 20 September. One of these, Colm Coughlan scored six points from frees, including the winner in stoppage time. Paul Scully lifted the Loughnane Cup.

 On 19 October 2014, Seir Kieran beat Ballinamere by 2-12 to 1-8, to win a magnificent seventh Junior 'A' Title. Michael John Corrigan was captain. On 6 September at Crinkill, the panel had beaten Birr by 4-13 to 1-13 in the Final of the Division 2 League. The Clareen goals were scored by Peadar Murray, Michael John Corrigan and Michael Gilligan. Peadar Murray was nominated as Offaly's Junior hurling player of the year for 2014.

Honours
Offaly Senior Hurling Championship (4): 1988, 1995, 1996, 1998
Offaly Senior 'B' Hurling Championship (1): 2019
Offaly Senior Hurling League (Pat Carroll Cup) (6): 1988, 1989, 1994, 1996, 2000, 2011, 2016
 Offaly Intermediate Hurling Championship 4: 1931, 1938, 1943, 1947
 Offaly Intermediate Hurling League (1): 2014, 2019
 Offaly Junior A Hurling Championship (7): 1912, 1923, 1937, 1958, 1969, 2006, 2014
 Offaly Junior 'A' Hurling League (4) 1987, 1988, 1990, 2008, 2013
 Offaly Under 21 'A' Hurling Championship (1): 2008

Bibliography
 James Kieran Blake (Author), Muiris O'Sullivan (Editor) (2006), The Music of the Ash – A History of the Seir Kieran GAA Club
 Ann Bach, Kieran Troy & Clareen ICA Guild (1993), Approach The Fountain – A History of Seir-Kieran, Clareen
 Tom Ryall (1984), Kilkenny: The GAA Story 1884-1984
Jim Walsh (2013), James Nowlan – The Alderman and the GAA in his Time 
 Paddy Murray (2013), Relating To Roscomroe – A compilation of historical stories, facts and other matters of interest 1305-1960's
 Enda McEvoy (2012), The Godfather Of Modern Hurling – The Father Tommy Maher Story
 Michael Duignan/ Pat Nolan (2011), Life, death & Hurling – The Michael Duignan Story
 Alan Walsh (2012), Magic Memories – Birr GAA Club through the lens
 Con Houlihan (2003), More than a game – Selected sporting essays
 Denis Walsh (2005), Hurling: The Revolution Years

See also
Ciarán of Saigir
Saighir

References

External links
 Seir Kieran Parish website
 Offaly GAA website

Gaelic games clubs in County Offaly
Hurling clubs in County Offaly